= List of freedom indices =

This article is a list of freedom indices produced by several non-governmental organizations that publish and maintain assessments of the state of freedom in the world, according to their own various definitions of the term, and rank countries using various measures of freedom, including civil liberties, political rights and economic rights. Some of the indices measure only some aspects of freedom, such as democracy or corruption.

== Prominent indices ==
The indices and their origins:

- Canada
  - The Economic Freedom of the World is a report published by Canada-based Fraser Institute in conjunction with the Economic Freedom Network, a group of independent research and educational institutes in 90 nations and territories worldwide. It is a numeric index, and its results are not currently included in the table below.
- Canada, United States, Germany
  - The Human Freedom Index presents the state of human freedom in the world based on a broad measure that encompasses personal, civil, and economic freedom. The index presents a broad measure of human freedom, understood as the absence of coercive constraint. It uses 79 distinct indicators of personal and economic freedom. The index covers the following areas: Rule of Law, Security and Safety, Movement, Religion, Association, Assembly, Civil Society, Expression, Relationships, Size of Government, Legal System and Property Rights, Access to Sound Money, Freedom to Trade Internationally, and Regulation of Credit, Labor, and Business. The Human Freedom Index was created in 2015, covering 152 countries for years 2008–2012. The Human Freedom Index 2016 was published in November 2016, covering 159 countries for years 2008–2015. The report is co-published by the Cato Institute, the Fraser Institute, and the Liberales Institut at the Friedrich Naumann Foundation for Freedom. Co-authors of the report are Ian Vásquez and Tanja Porčnik.
  - The Index of Freedom in the World was a predecessor to the Human Freedom Index. It measured classical civil liberties and was published in 2013 by Canada's Fraser Institute, Germany's Liberales Institute, and the U.S. Cato Institute. It is not currently included in the table below.
- France
  - World Press Freedom Index, is published each year since 2002 (except that 2011 was combined with 2012) by France-based Reporters Without Borders. Countries are assessed as having a good situation, a satisfactory situation, noticeable problems, a difficult situation, or a very serious situation.
- Spain
  - The World Index of Moral Freedom was first published on April 2, 2016, by the Foundation for the Advancement of Liberty, based in Madrid, Spain. This index ranks 160 countries by five categories of indicators: religious freedom, bioethical freedom, drugs freedom, sexuality freedom and family and gender freedom. The index aims at establishing the degree of individual freedom or state control on decisions pertaining to the great moral debates of our time.
- Sweden
  - MaxRange, developed by Max Rånge, and maintained by Mikael Sandberg and Max Rånge, political scientists at Halmstad University, Sweden, is a data set defining a country's level of democracy and institutional structure (regime-type) on a 1000-point graded scale. Values are sorted based on level of democracy and political accountability. MaxRange defines the value corresponding to all states every month from 1789 to the present.
  - V-Dem Democracy indices by V-Dem Institute at the Department of Political Science at the University of Gothenburg in Sweden is an approach to conceptualizing and measuring democracy. It provides a multidimensional and disaggregated dataset that reflects the complexity of the concept of democracy as a system of rule that goes beyond the simple presence of elections. The V-Dem project distinguishes between five high-level principles of democracy

electoral, liberal, participatory, deliberative, and egalitarian, and collects data to measure these principles. With six principal investigators (PIs), seventeen project managers (PMs) with special responsibility for issue areas, more than thirty regional managers (RMs), 170 country coordinators (CCs), research assistants, and 3,000 country experts (CEs), the V-Dem project is one of the largest social science data collection projects focusing on research.

  - International IDEAs "Global State of Democracy Report" provides democratic performance of 168 to 170 countries. "The GSoD Indices are based on 116 individual indicators devised by various scholars and organizations using different types of sources: expert surveys, standards-based coding by research groups and analysts, observational data and composite measures. The Varieties of Democracy project is the largest contributor of indicators to the Global State of Democracies Indices.
- Switzerland
  - Global Corruption Index, rates and ranks countries by a metric that measures the risk of corruption in the country by using 43 variables. It covers 196 countries and territories and is published by the Swiss-based company, Global Risk Profile.
- United Kingdom
  - The Economist Democracy Index, published by the UK-based Economist Intelligence Unit, is an assessment of countries' democracy. Countries are rated as full democracies, flawed democracies, hybrid regimes, or authoritarian regimes. The index is based on 60 indicators grouped in five different categories measuring pluralism, civil liberties, and political culture.
- United States
  - The CIRI Human Rights Data Project measures a range of human, civil, women's, and workers' rights. It was created in 1994 and is now hosted by the University of Connecticut. In its 2011 report, the U.S. was ranked 38th in overall human rights.
  - Freedom in the World, published each year since 1972 by the U.S.-based Freedom House, ranks countries by political rights and civil liberties that are derived in large measure from the Universal Declaration of Human Rights. Countries are assessed as free, partly free, or unfree.
  - Freedom of the Press is a report published each year since 1980 by Freedom House.
  - The Index of Economic Freedom is an annual report published by The Wall Street Journal and the U.S.-based Heritage Foundation. Countries are assessed as free, mostly free, moderately free, mostly unfree, and repressed.
  - The U.S.-based Polity data series is a widely used data series in political science research. It contains coded annual information on regime authority characteristics and transitions for all independent states with total populations greater than 500,000 and covers the years 1800–2018. Polity's conclusions about a state's level of democracy are based on an evaluation of that state's elections for competitiveness, openness, and level of participation. Data from this series is not currently included in the table below. The Polity work is sponsored by the Political Instability Task Force (PITF) which is funded by the U.S. Central Intelligence Agency; however, the views expressed in the reports are the authors' alone and do not represent the views of the U.S. Government.

== Annual assessments ==
Here is a table of the assessments by four indices, for most countries of the world. For exact rankings rather than assessments, refer to the individual index articles.

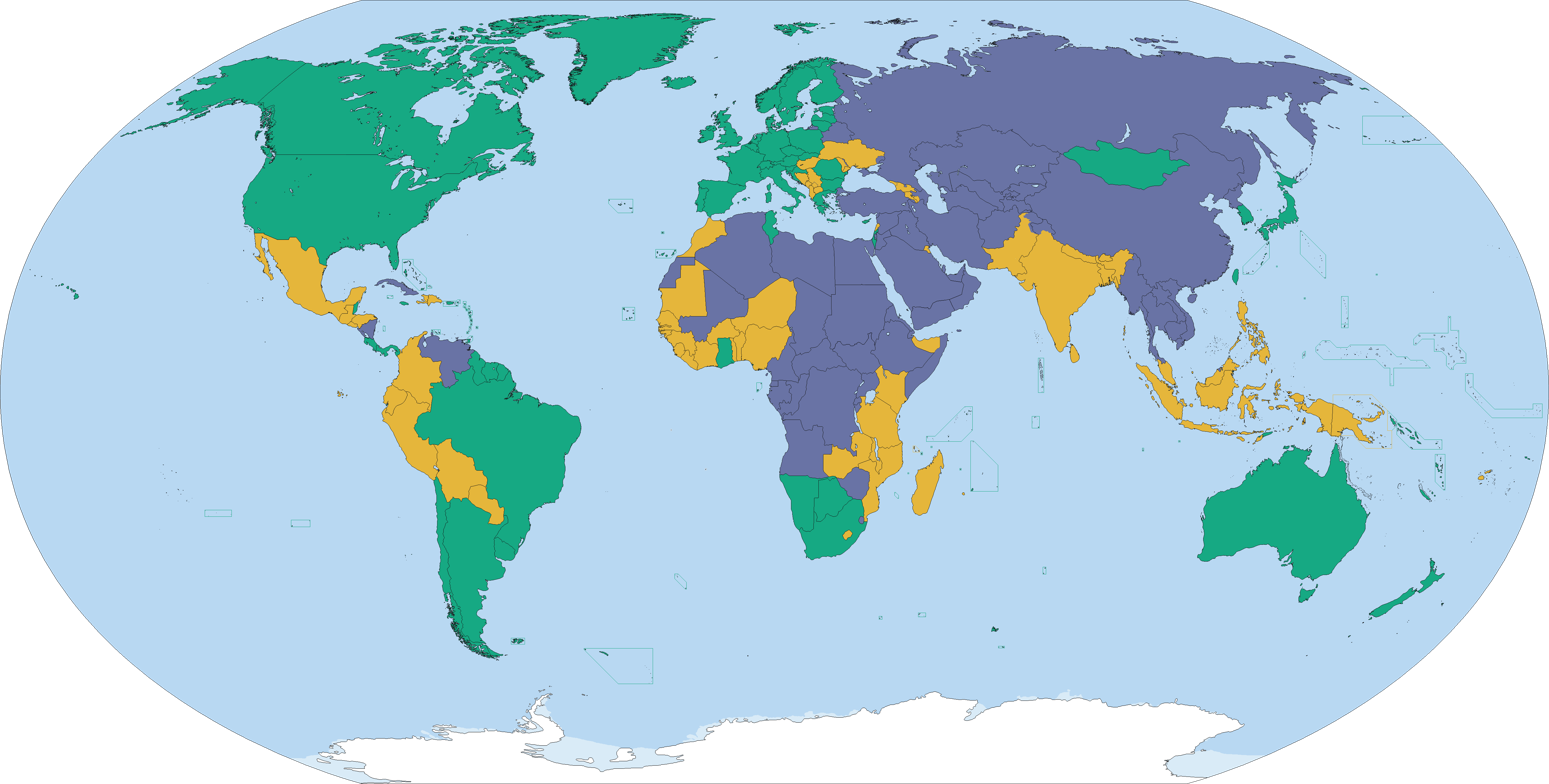
Country ratings from 2021 Freedom in the World by Freedom House

2021 Index of Economic Freedom by The Heritage Foundation and Wall Street Journal

The Economist Democracy Index in 2024 by the Economist Intelligence Unit

World Press Freedom Index in 2026, according to Reporters Without Borders

Index	Scale				
Freedom in the World	free		partly free		not free
Index of Economic Freedom	free	mostly free	moderately free	mostly unfree	repressed
World Press Freedom Index	good	satisfactory	problematic	difficult	very serious
The Economist Democracy Index	full democracy		flawed democracy	hybrid regime	authoritarian

== List of scores by country/territory ==
Country/territory	Freedom in the World 2026	Score change since 2025	Index of Economic Freedom 2026	Score	Press Freedom Index 2025	Score	Democracy Index 2024	Score
Abkhazia	40	+1	n/a	—	n/a	—	n/a	—
Afghanistan	8	+2	n/a	—	very serious	17.88	authoritarian	0.25
Albania	69	+1	moderately free	68.0 ▲	problematic	58.18	flawed democracy	6.20
Algeria	31	-	repressed	45.8 ▼	difficult	44.64	authoritarian	3.55
Andorra	93	-	n/a	—	problematic	63.30	n/a	—
Angola	28	-	mostly unfree	54.4 ▼	difficult	52.67	hybrid regime	4.05
Antigua and Barbuda	83	-	n/a	—	problematic	58.36	n/a	—
Argentina	85	-	mostly unfree	57.4 ▲	problematic	56.14	flawed democracy	6.51
Armenia	54	-	moderately free	67.1 ▲	satisfactory	73.96	hybrid regime	5.35
Australia	94	-1	free	80.1 ▲	satisfactory	75.15	full democracy	8.85
Austria	94	+1	moderately free	69.8 ▲	satisfactory	78.12	full democracy	8.28
Azad Kashmir	30	-	n/a	—	n/a	—	n/a	—
Azerbaijan	6	-1	moderately free	64.3 ▲	very serious	25.47	authoritarian	2.80
Bahrain	12	-	moderately free	65.7 ▲	very serious	30.24	authoritarian	2.45
Bangladesh	44	-1	mostly unfree	54.8 ▲	very serious	33.71	hybrid regime	4.44
Barbados	94	-	mostly free	70.4 ▲	n/a	—	n/a	—
Belarus	7	-	repressed	49.1 ▲	very serious	25.73	authoritarian	1.99
Belgium	95	-1	moderately free	69.2 ▲	satisfactory	80.12	flawed democracy	7.64
Belize	87	-1	moderately free	64.7 ▲	problematic	68.32	n/a	—
Benin	61	+1	moderately free	60.0 ▲	difficult	54.60	hybrid regime	4.44
Bhutan	69	+1	mostly unfree	57.5	very serious	32.62	hybrid regime	5.65
Bolivia	69	+4	repressed	42.4 ▼	difficult	54.09	hybrid regime	4.26
Bosnia and Herzegovina	54	+2	moderately free	63.1 ▼	problematic	56.33	hybrid regime	5.06
Botswana	75	-	moderately free	67.7 ▼	problematic	57.64	flawed democracy	7.63
Brazil	73	+1	mostly unfree	52.4 ▼	problematic	63.80	flawed democracy	6.49
Brunei	27	-	moderately free	67.5 ▲	difficult	53.47	n/a	—
Bulgaria	74	-3	moderately free	68.9 ▲	problematic	60.78	flawed democracy	6.34
Burkina Faso	20	-5	repressed	49.1 ▼	difficult	52.25	authoritarian	2.55
Burundi	13	-2	repressed	40.2 ▲	difficult	45.44	authoritarian	2.13
Cambodia	22	-1	mostly unfree	58.7 ▲	very serious	28.18	authoritarian	2.94
Cameroon	15	-	mostly unfree	52.0 ▼	difficult	42.75	authoritarian	2.56
Canada	97	-	mostly free	75.6 ▲	satisfactory	78.75	full democracy	8.69
Cape Verde	92	-	mostly free	71.4 ▲	satisfactory	74.98	flawed democracy	7.58
Central African Republic	5	-	repressed	43.1 ▲	problematic	60.15	authoritarian	1.18
Chad	15	-	mostly unfree	51.2 ▼	difficult	51.89	authoritarian	1.89
Chile	95	-	mostly free	74.3 ▲	problematic	62.25	flawed democracy	7.83
China	9	-	repressed	48.3 ▼	very serious	14.80	authoritarian	2.11
Colombia	69	-1	mostly unfree	59.8	difficult	49.80	flawed democracy	6.35
Comoros	41	-1	mostly unfree	52.7 ▲	problematic	59.27	authoritarian	2.84
Costa Rica	91	-	moderately free	69.1 ▲	satisfactory	73.09	full democracy	8.29
Croatia	82	-	moderately free	67.5 ▼	problematic	64.20	flawed democracy	6.50
Cuba	9	-1	repressed	25.2 ▼	very serious	26.03	authoritarian	2.58
Cyprus	90	-1	mostly free	74.1 ▲	problematic	59.04	flawed democracy	7.38
Czech Republic	95	-	mostly free	73.2 ▲	satisfactory	83.96	full democracy	8.08
Democratic Republic of the Congo	18	-	repressed	47.0 ▼	difficult	42.31	authoritarian	1.92
Denmark	97	-	mostly free	79.0 ▼	good	86.93	full democracy	9.28
Djibouti	24	-	mostly unfree	56.3 ▲	very serious	25.36	authoritarian	2.70
Dominica	92	-	mostly unfree	56.1 ▲	problematic	58.36	n/a	—
Dominican Republic	67	-1	moderately free	63.8 ▼	problematic	69.87	flawed democracy	6.62
Ecuador	64	-1	mostly unfree	55.6 ▼	difficult	53.76	hybrid regime	5.24
Egypt	18	-	mostly unfree	50.3 ▼	very serious	24.74	authoritarian	2.79
El Salvador	42	-5	mostly unfree	57.7 ▲	difficult	41.19	hybrid regime	4.61
Equatorial Guinea	5	-	repressed	47.4 ▼	difficult	48.68	authoritarian	1.92
Eritrea	3	-	repressed	39.6 ▲	very serious	11.32	authoritarian	1.97
Estonia	96	-	mostly free	78.7 ▼	good	89.46	full democracy	8.13
Eswatini	17	-	mostly unfree	57.5 ▲	difficult	52.86	authoritarian	2.60
Ethiopia	18	-	repressed	48.1	very serious	36.92	authoritarian	3.24
Fiji	72	+3	mostly unfree	59.5 ▲	satisfactory	71.20	hybrid regime	5.55
Finland	100	-	mostly free	76.6 ▼	good	87.18	full democracy	9.30
France	89	-	moderately free	64.6 ▲	satisfactory	76.62	flawed democracy	7.99
Gabon	25	+4	mostly unfree	56.6 ▲	satisfactory	70.65	authoritarian	2.18
Gaza Strip	2	-	n/a	---	n/a	—	n/a	—
Georgia	51	-4	moderately free	69.6 ▲	difficult	50.53	hybrid regime	4.70
Germany	95	-	mostly free	71.7 ▲	satisfactory	83.85	full democracy	8.73
Ghana	80	-	mostly unfree	57.3 ▲	problematic	67.13	flawed democracy	6.24
Greece	85	-	moderately free	63.2 ▲	problematic	55.37	full democracy	8.07
Grenada	89	-	n/a	—	problematic	58.36	n/a	—
Guatemala	48	-	moderately free	63.5 ▲	difficult	40.32	hybrid regime	4.55
Guinea	28	-2	mostly unfree	53.1 ▼	difficult	52.53	authoritarian	2.04
Guinea-Bissau	33	-8	repressed	43.2 ▼	difficult	51.36	authoritarian	2.03
Guyana	74	-	mostly unfree	58.7 ▲	problematic	60.12	flawed democracy	6.11
Haiti	22	-2	repressed	46.1	difficult	51.06	authoritarian	2.74
Honduras	47	-1	mostly unfree	59.1 ▼	very serious	38.51	hybrid regime	4.98
Hong Kong	41	+1	n/a	—	very serious	39.86	hybrid regime	5.09
Hungary	65	-	moderately free	62.5 ▲	problematic	62.82	flawed democracy	6.51
Iceland	95	-	mostly free	75.0 ▲	satisfactory	81.36	full democracy	9.38
India	62	-1	mostly unfree	52.5 ▼	very serious	32.96	flawed democracy	7.29
Indonesia	56	-	moderately free	65.1 ▼	difficult	44.13	flawed democracy	6.44
Iran	10	-1	repressed	41.8 ▼	very serious	16.22	authoritarian	1.96
Iraq	31	-	n/a	—	very serious	30.69	authoritarian	2.80
Ireland	98	+1	free	83.3 ▲	good	86.92	full democracy	9.19
Israel	73	-	moderately free	68.4 ▼	difficult	51.05	flawed democracy	7.80
Italy	87	-2	moderately free	63.3 ▲	problematic	68.01	flawed democracy	7.58
Ivory Coast	46	-3	mostly unfree	58.1 ▲	problematic	63.69	hybrid regime	4.22
Jamaica	81	+1	moderately free	68.2 ▼	satisfactory	75.71	flawed democracy	6.74
Jammu and Kashmir	38	-	n/a	—	n/a	—	n/a	—
Japan	96	-	mostly free	70.3 ▲	problematic	63.14	full democracy	8.48
Jordan	34	-	mostly unfree	59.3 ▼	very serious	35.25	authoritarian	3.28
Kazakhstan	23	-	moderately free	64.2 ▲	very serious	39.34	authoritarian	3.08
Kenya	49	-2	mostly unfree	55.5 ▲	difficult	49.41	hybrid regime	5.05
Kiribati	89	-	mostly unfree	50.8 ▼	n/a	—	n/a	—
Kosovo	61	+1	moderately free	62.4 ▲	difficult	52.73	n/a	—
Kuwait	30	-1	mostly unfree	59.9	difficult	44.06	authoritarian	2.78
Kyrgyzstan	25	-1	mostly unfree	56.0 ▲	very serious	37.46	authoritarian	3.52
Laos	13	-	mostly unfree	50.9 ▼	very serious	33.22	authoritarian	1.71
Latvia	89	-	mostly free	71.6 ▲	satisfactory	81.82	flawed democracy	7.66
Lebanon	41	+2	repressed	43.1 ▼	difficult	42.62	authoritarian	3.56
Lesotho	67	+1	mostly unfree	54.9 ▲	difficult	52.07	flawed democracy	6.06
Liberia	65	+1	repressed	49.8 ▲	problematic	66.61	hybrid regime	5.57
Libya	10	-	n/a	—	difficult	40.42	authoritarian	2.31
Liechtenstein	90	-	n/a	—	satisfactory	83.42	n/a	—
Lithuania	90	+1	mostly free	75.3 ▲	satisfactory	82.27	flawed democracy	7.59
Luxembourg	97	-	mostly free	79.7 ▲	satisfactory	83.04	full democracy	8.88
Madagascar	50	-5	mostly unfree	57.0	difficult	50.80	hybrid regime	5.33
Malawi	68	+3	mostly unfree	50.7 ▼	problematic	59.20	hybrid regime	5.85
Malaysia	53	-	moderately free	68.0 ▲	problematic	56.09	flawed democracy	7.11
Maldives	41	-2	repressed	47.6 ▼	difficult	52.46	n/a	—
Mali	21	-3	mostly unfree	52.1 ▼	difficult	48.23	authoritarian	2.40
Malta	88	+1	moderately free	68.2 ▲	problematic	62.96	flawed democracy	7.93
Marshall Islands	93	-	n/a	—	n/a	—	n/a	—
Mauritania	38	-1	mostly unfree	53.9 ▼	problematic	67.52	authoritarian	3.96
Mauritius	87	+1	mostly free	73.0 ▼	problematic	67.31	full democracy	8.23
Mexico	58	-1	mostly unfree	59.8 ▼	difficult	45.55	hybrid regime	5.32
Micronesia	92	-	moderately free	62.9 ▲	n/a	—	n/a	—
Moldova	60	-	mostly unfree	58.1 ▼	satisfactory	73.36	flawed democracy	6.04
Monaco	82	-	n/a	—	n/a	—	n/a	—
Mongolia	84	-	moderately free	63.9 ▲	difficult	52.57	flawed democracy	6.53
Montenegro	68	-1	moderately free	63.8	satisfactory	72.83	flawed democracy	6.73
Morocco	37	-	moderately free	61.8 ▲	difficult	48.04	hybrid regime	4.97
Mozambique	42	+1	repressed	49.6 ▼	difficult	52.63	authoritarian	3.38
Myanmar	4	-3	repressed	44.5 ▲	very serious	25.32	authoritarian	0.96
Namibia	73	-	moderately free	60.2 ▲	satisfactory	75.35	flawed democracy	6.48
Nauru	75	-	n/a	—	n/a	—	n/a	—
Nepal	59	-3	mostly unfree	52.9 ▲	problematic	55.20	hybrid regime	4.60
Netherlands	97	-	mostly free	78.5 ▲	good	88.64	full democracy	9.00
New Zealand	99	-	mostly free	77.8 ▼	satisfactory	81.37	full democracy	9.61
Nicaragua	14	-	mostly unfree	53.6 ▼	very serious	22.83	authoritarian	2.09
Niger	27	-3	mostly unfree	51.0 ▼	problematic	57.05	authoritarian	2.26
Nigeria	44	-	mostly unfree	54.8 ▲	difficult	46.81	hybrid regime	4.16
North Korea	3	-	repressed	3.1 ▲	very serious	12.64	authoritarian	1.08
North Macedonia	67	-	moderately free	63.3 ▲	satisfactory	70.44	flawed democracy	6.28
Northern Cyprus	75	-1	n/a	---	difficult	54.84	n/a	—
Norway	99	-	mostly free	78.8 ▲	good	92.31	full democracy	9.81
Oman	24	-	moderately free	68.5 ▲	difficult	42.29	authoritarian	3.05
Pakistan	32	-	repressed	48.9 ▼	very serious	29.62	authoritarian	2.84
Palau	92	-	n/a	—	n/a	—	n/a	—
Palestine	n/a	—	n/a	—	very serious	27.41	authoritarian	3.44
Panama	82	-1	moderately free	64.9 ▼	problematic	66.75	flawed democracy	6.84
Papua New Guinea	61	-	mostly unfree	54.3 ▲	problematic	58.35	hybrid regime	5.97
Paraguay	63	-	moderately free	66.4 ▲	problematic	56.84	hybrid regime	5.92
Peru	66	-1	moderately free	66.3 ▲	difficult	42.88	hybrid regime	5.69
Philippines	58	-	moderately free	62.9 ▲	difficult	49.57	flawed democracy	6.63
Poland	82	-	moderately free	68.5 ▲	satisfactory	74.79	flawed democracy	7.40
Portugal	96	-	mostly free	71.2 ▲	satisfactory	84.26	full democracy	8.08
Qatar	25	-	mostly free	70.2	problematic	58.25	authoritarian	3.17
Republic of the Congo	17	-	repressed	48.6	problematic	60.58	authoritarian	2.79
Romania	83	+1	moderately free	65.4 ▼	problematic	66.42	hybrid regime	5.99
Russia	12	-	mostly unfree	50.3 ▼	very serious	24.57	authoritarian	2.03
Rwanda	21	-	mostly unfree	56.5 ▲	very serious	35.84	authoritarian	3.34
Samoa	84	-	moderately free	68.0 ▲	problematic	69.28	n/a	—
San Marino	97	-	n/a	—	n/a	—	n/a	—
São Tomé and Príncipe	84	-	moderately free	60.6 ▲	n/a	—	n/a	—
Saudi Arabia	9	-	moderately free	65.4 ▲	very serious	27.94	authoritarian	2.08
Senegal	70	+1	mostly unfree	53.2 ▼	problematic	59.43	hybrid regime	5.93
Serbia	53	-3	moderately free	65.0 ▲	difficult	53.55	flawed democracy	6.26
Seychelles	81	+1	moderately free	66.5 ▲	problematic	68.56	n/a	—
Sierra Leone	61	+2	repressed	49.6 ▲	problematic	66.36	hybrid regime	4.32
Singapore	48	-	free	84.4 ▲	difficult	45.78	flawed democracy	6.18
Slovakia	88	-1	moderately free	67.7 ▼	satisfactory	71.93	flawed democracy	7.21
Slovenia	97	+1	moderately free	69.7 ▲	satisfactory	74.06	flawed democracy	7.82
Solomon Islands	74	-1	mostly unfree	53.7 ▼	n/a	—	n/a	—
Somalia	8	-	n/a	—	difficult	40.49	n/a	—
Somaliland	47	-	n/a	—	n/a	—	n/a	—
South Africa	81	-	mostly unfree	58.6 ▲	satisfactory	75.71	flawed democracy	7.16
South Korea	83	+2	mostly free	73.7 ▼	problematic	64.06	flawed democracy	7.75
South Ossetia	12	-	n/a	—	n/a	—	n/a	—
South Sudan	0	-1	n/a	—	difficult	51.63	n/a	—
Spain	91	+1	moderately free	66.8 ▲	satisfactory	77.35	full democracy	8.13
Sri Lanka	63	+5	mostly unfree	50.3 ▲	very serious	39.93	flawed democracy	6.19
St. Kitts and Nevis	89	-	n/a	—	problematic	58.36	n/a	—
St. Lucia	91	-	moderately free	67.5 ▲	problematic	58.36	n/a	—
St. Vincent and the Grenadines	90	-	moderately free	60.0 ▼	problematic	58.36	n/a	—
Sudan	1	-1	repressed	32.5 ▼	very serious	30.34	authoritarian	1.46
Suriname	81	+1	mostly unfree	53.0 ▲	satisfactory	74.49	flawed democracy	6.79
Sweden	99	-	mostly free	77.8 ▼	good	88.13	full democracy	9.39
Switzerland	96	-	free	83.7	satisfactory	83.98	full democracy	9.32
Syria	10	+5	n/a	—	very serious	15.82	authoritarian	1.32
Taiwan	93	-1	mostly free	79.8 ▲	satisfactory	77.04	full democracy	8.78
Tajikistan	5	-	mostly unfree	52.5 ▲	very serious	32.21	authoritarian	1.83
Tanzania	28	-7	mostly unfree	59.0 ▼	difficult	53.68	hybrid regime	5.20
Thailand	33	-1	moderately free	62.2 ▲	problematic	56.72	flawed democracy	6.27
The Bahamas	90	-	moderately free	65.1 ▲	n/a	—	n/a	—
The Gambia	51	+1	mostly unfree	56.3 ▼	problematic	65.49	hybrid regime	4.47
Tibet	0	-	n/a	—	n/a	—	n/a	—
Timor-Leste	73	+1	repressed	47.9	satisfactory	71.79	flawed democracy	7.03
Togo	37	-4	mostly unfree	51.6 ▼	difficult	48.03	authoritarian	2.99
Tonga	79	-1	mostly unfree	58.9 ▲	problematic	68.39	n/a	—
Transnistria	16	-1	n/a	—	n/a	—	n/a	—
Trinidad and Tobago	83	+1	moderately free	62.4 ▼	satisfactory	79.71	flawed democracy	7.09
Tunisia	42	-2	repressed	48.1 ▼	difficult	43.48	hybrid regime	4.71
Turkey	32	-1	mostly unfree	55.0 ▼	very serious	29.40	hybrid regime	4.26
Turkmenistan	1	-	repressed	47.0 ▼	very serious	19.14	authoritarian	1.66
Tuvalu	93	-	n/a	—	n/a	—	n/a	—
Uganda	33	-1	mostly unfree	52.4 ▲	very serious	37.61	hybrid regime	4.49
Ukraine	51	-	n/a	—	problematic	63.93	hybrid regime	4.90
Russian-occupied territories of Ukraine	-1	-	n/a	—	n/a	—	n/a	—
United Arab Emirates	18	-	mostly free	71.9 ▲	very serious	26.91	authoritarian	3.07
United Kingdom	92	-	mostly free	70.4 ▲	satisfactory	78.89	full democracy	8.34
United States	81	-3	mostly free	72.8 ▲	problematic	65.49	flawed democracy	7.85
Uruguay	97	+1	moderately free	69.8 ▼	problematic	65.18	full democracy	8.67
Uzbekistan	12	-	moderately free	60.3 ▲	very serious	35.24	authoritarian	2.10
Vanuatu	82	-	moderately free	61.1 ▼	n/a	—	n/a	—
Venezuela	13	-	repressed	27.3 ▼	very serious	29.21	authoritarian	2.25
Vietnam	20	-	moderately free	64.4 ▼	very serious	19.74	authoritarian	2.62
West Bank	22	-	n/a	---	n/a	—	n/a	—
Western Sahara	4	-	n/a	---	difficult	48.04	n/a	—
Yemen	10	-	n/a	—	very serious	31.45	authoritarian	1.95
Zambia	53	-	mostly unfree	51.9 ▲	problematic	57.33	hybrid regime	5.73
Zimbabwe	25	-1	repressed	35.2 ▲	difficult	52.10	authoritarian	2.98

== See also ==
- Democracy indices
- Democracy-Dictatorship Index
- Censorship by country
- Corruption Perceptions Index
- Ease of doing business index
- Indices of economic freedom
- Internet censorship and surveillance by country
- Media transparency
