= Democracy Ranking =

Annual global ranking of liberal democracies

The Democracy Ranking was an index compiled by the Association for Development and Advancement of the Democracy Award, an Austria-based non-partisan organization. Democracy Ranking produced an annual global ranking of liberal democracies. The applied conceptual formula, which measures the quality of democracy, integrates democracy and other characteristics of the political system with the performance of non-political dimensions (gender, economy, knowledge, health, and environment). Democracy Ranking has emphasized a broader understanding of democracy, creating a conceptual link between politics and the output and performance of society. The Democracy Ranking has compared several-year intervals, delivering ranking results, which show how ranking positions and score levels have developed recently.

== Ranking 2016 ==
Rank	Country	Score	Political system	Economy	Environment	Gender equality	Health	Knowledge	Gender comprehensive
1	Norway	87.1	99.2	84.7	59.9	84.7	84.3	61.4	92.1
2	Switzerland	86.7	92.2	80.5	82.6	81.2	88.2	73.5	85.6
3	Sweden	86.2	97.4	67.4	71.4	85.3	84.8	66.2	91.0
4	Finland	86.0	99.7	63.7	60.6	84.7	82.1	70.2	92.4
5	Denmark	85.1	94.3	69.5	78.1	82.8	81.4	67.6	87.3
6	Netherlands	83.3	93.6	69.7	59.3	81.9	84.9	68.7	86.5
7	New Zealand	81.4	92.2	63.3	66.3	82.8	81.3	59.1	86.8
8	Germany	81.3	90.2	71.1	60.5	78.0	85.3	67.2	83.9
9	Ireland	80.9	91.5	63.2	71.9	75.8	79.4	61.5	84.2
10	Australia	80.5	87.6	69.8	59.9	83.6	83.6	70.0	84.8
11	Belgium	80.3	90.5	61.5	55.5	81.3	84.0	68.0	85.1
12	Canada	79.9	89.7	68.3	56.3	82.0	82.0	62.0	84.9
13	Austria	79.9	85.5	69.1	66.4	80.2	86.6	69.1	82.0
14	United Kingdom	79.6	87.8	62.3	70.6	80.6	79.8	64.1	83.5
15	France	78.2	85.2	59.2	69.8	78.1	86.3	62.6	82.0
16	United States	76.5	84.2	71.5	49.1	78.7	83.0	62.3	80.5
17	Slovenia	75.9	83.7	54.6	62.4	79.9	79.3	64.5	82.6
18	Japan	75.5	79.8	57.1	63.8	82.0	87.7	65.8	78.8
19	Spain	75.3	83.1	42.4	75.2	76.8	85.0	58.1	80.8
20	Portugal	74.8	85.1	45.2	67.8	74.4	80.3	54.1	79.7
21	Uruguay	73.5	83.3	52.2	78.5	73.8	71.5	43.2	77.0
22	Lithuania	72.5	81.2	55.0	70.8	76.1	68.0	49.1	78.6
23	Estonia	72.5	84.8	60.5	31.7	79.7	72.3	56.5	81.2
24	Chile	72.0	81.4	51.2	67.3	76.9	76.8	41.4	78.4
25	Czech Republic	72.0	79.4	60.5	57.2	74.9	76.1	54.5	76.4
26	Israel	71.9	72.8	60.9	65.0	78.2	81.4	69.3	74.7
27	Poland	71.4	80.5	53.5	66.6	74.9	71.9	44.2	77.4
28	Italy	71.1	75.4	48.7	72.9	73.8	84.0	54.8	75.6
29	Hong Kong	70.7	60.9	77.2	91.4	80.0	100.0	54.1	71.5
30	Latvia	70.6	78.8	53.8	71.6	76.2	66.3	44.3	78.4
31	Costa Rica	70.2	80.2	44.7	79.0	70.1	73.1	34.5	74.9
32	South Korea	70.2	69.1	62.8	57.4	78.6	82.4	75.2	72.5
33	Cyprus	69.1	77.1	46.2	67.1	73.0	76.5	43.3	74.5
34	Slovakia	68.0	75.2	51.5	64.2	68.3	72.6	47.1	71.3
35	Croatia	67.0	73.6	39.1	72.2	69.9	73.1	47.8	72.7
36	Singapore	65.9	52.2	90.5	78.1	86.6	79.7	63.1	65.5
37	Greece	65.4	68.1	32.9	66.2	69.4	84.3	60.3	69.9
38	Panama	65.3	71.7	53.2	75.9	67.7	69.7	28.3	72.5
39	Mauritius	65.1	73.3	50.7	75.3	62.5	64.1	31.6	67.1
40	Romania	65.0	70.0	52.0	73.2	69.4	66.7	38.4	70.4
41	Bulgaria	64.4	70.4	49.7	58.5	71.7	70.4	41.5	72.7
42	Hungary	64.0	67.9	52.1	60.0	71.0	71.1	46.0	69.2
43	Argentina	63.9	67.4	46.4	66.5	73.7	68.5	47.4	73.5
44	Brazil	62.5	66.9	46.0	71.2	69.6	64.2	39.4	69.6
45	Trinidad and Tobago	61.1	71.3	60.1	38.9	68.0	55.2	32.0	70.8
46	Serbia	60.6	67.9	29.9	60.2	61.9	70.5	44.0	66.4
47	Peru	60.0	61.9	52.4	75.4	71.0	61.5	30.4	67.7
48	Jamaica	60.0	69.0	35.0	62.5	61.6	65.8	29.6	64.8
49	Mongolia	59.8	72.8	45.7	37.9	68.7	55.6	25.9	72.4
50	El Salvador	58.7	63.9	47.1	75.6	63.1	59.0	22.9	64.2
51	Ghana	57.8	71.6	41.9	76.4	53.1	31.9	16.9	62.2
52	Philippines	57.7	64.0	44.9	77.3	59.1	50.0	25.8	64.1
53	Colombia	57.3	58.0	46.3	79.0	65.9	61.8	30.3	63.7
54	Namibia	57.2	68.9	37.9	73.9	52.0	44.4	19.2	63.6
55	Albania	56.9	58.5	36.0	64.0	65.8	68.4	42.2	63.3
56	Tunisia	56.6	61.6	41.6	71.8	52.0	62.2	30.0	57.4
57	Georgia	56.4	58.7	40.9	68.9	65.8	66.3	28.8	61.9
58	Botswana	56.3	64.6	43.6	73.0	53.9	40.7	28.3	60.2
59	Dominican Republic	55.9	61.3	37.8	70.9	56.5	58.3	29.1	59.9
60	Mexico	55.7	55.6	50.0	71.1	65.1	67.1	25.8	62.3
61	Moldova	55.6	57.9	47.9	61.5	63.3	62.6	31.4	63.0
62	Ecuador	55.5	55.0	45.8	70.8	70.0	66.2	26.9	65.4
63	Bolivia	55.4	61.6	44.8	62.6	66.0	48.2	24.3	65.7
64	Senegal	55.3	66.1	37.3	67.7	54.7	43.9	18.9	61.8
65	India	54.8	63.6	46.6	68.6	50.9	45.9	18.1	57.5
66	Nicaragua	54.0	55.5	41.8	71.7	67.3	62.9	18.5	64.0
67	Timor-Leste	53.7	56.8	39.3	93.7	50.3	46.4	23.0	54.8
68	Indonesia	53.5	56.7	47.4	72.9	57.5	47.7	25.8	57.7
69	Paraguay	53.0	53.8	44.6	65.9	62.9	60.6	27.0	60.2
70	Ukraine	52.3	54.3	42.8	29.7	72.3	62.9	43.6	65.3
71	South Africa	52.2	70.5	26.9	48.6	35.9	30.6	27.8	57.1
72	Malawi	52.1	57.4	33.9	96.1	52.5	38.7	12.7	56.4
73	Benin	51.7	63.3	44.0	62.2	47.3	26.5	20.1	54.9
74	North Macedonia	51.3	53.4	27.1	66.7	53.8	67.3	31.4	54.6
75	Turkey	50.6	42.6	51.2	71.5	62.9	64.0	42.8	53.7
76	Malaysia	50.4	41.1	60.4	61.4	69.3	62.3	45.2	53.7
77	Papua New Guinea	49.9	54.7	42.1	75.6	54.5	36.0	17.4	54.4
78	Tanzania	49.5	53.7	41.5	68.7	61.3	40.3	15.1	60.8
79	Guatemala	49.0	48.2	50.8	66.1	58.1	57.1	17.0	54.3
80	Sri Lanka	49.0	42.7	46.8	83.8	63.1	62.1	20.5	55.3
81	Sierra Leone	48.3	56.5	40.8	93.9	44.1	12.8	9.5	51.1
82	Bangladesh	48.1	47.0	40.4	74.4	60.2	51.7	19.6	55.1
83	Madagascar	48.1	50.4	40.5	87.4	57.2	38.9	4.5	55.7
84	Kuwait	47.9	36.1	85.8	48.2	64.3	63.3	36.9	49.6
85	Honduras	47.7	44.4	42.6	67.7	58.0	61.9	25.2	52.6
86	Bosnia and Herzegovina	47.5	49.5	20.5	56.1	53.4	69.9	28.2	53.5
87	Liberia	47.4	50.3	39.6	91.2	44.9	33.6	13.0	48.1
88	Nepal	47.1	45.5	46.9	61.4	67.0	54.6	14.2	56.5
89	Lesotho	46.9	62.5	24.3	76.3	26.3	13.1	16.4	45.5
90	Kenya	46.4	49.4	35.9	71.9	53.4	34.7	20.6	53.5
91	Armenia	46.0	41.5	32.0	60.0	61.1	63.8	35.0	51.3
92	Zambia	45.5	50.1	32.3	73.4	57.3	31.0	10.4	53.5
93	Burkina Faso	45.3	46.2	41.8	91.8	47.3	25.5	15.9	46.0
94	Niger	43.2	49.4	40.0	72.1	33.3	32.5	7.2	39.6
95	Kyrgyzstan	43.0	39.1	37.3	51.0	64.7	56.3	24.9	53.1
96	Russian Federation	43.0	27.1	58.3	51.2	72.7	60.7	51.2	50.8
97	Lebanon	42.9	32.8	45.1	48.6	57.9	74.3	39.6	45.6
98	Morocco	42.5	35.1	43.0	69.5	48.7	59.0	29.6	40.6
99	Mozambique	42.5	53.5	23.3	65.2	35.4	20.9	12.2	47.3
100	Venezuela	42.2	31.4	33.3	60.6	68.2	62.9	39.4	52.9
101	Mali	39.5	36.8	38.5	99.2	33.8	23.8	16.1	33.7
102	Guinea	39.4	35.2	41.6	92.1	41.3	26.0	17.2	38.0
103	Togo	39.4	40.2	38.4	65.1	53.4	28.6	7.2	48.4
104	Nigeria	39.3	41.4	46.3	73.6	34.5	13.9	17.7	38.0
105	Haiti	39.0	36.4	36.3	67.6	57.0	39.3	7.9	46.5
106	Bahrain	38.6	18.2	71.5	50.7	64.4	66.9	41.9	39.6
107	China	38.3	21.9	47.7	53.9	67.9	66.0	38.3	45.5
108	Côte d'Ivoire	38.1	40.4	42.3	69.8	33.5	13.3	19.7	35.5
109	Egypt	35.7	24.8	32.7	70.6	45.3	55.5	29.2	34.2
110	Pakistan	34.9	32.4	41.5	61.5	34.6	38.8	10.7	31.7
111	Libya	29.5	15.8	32.2	57.1	45.0	58.2	23.4	29.6
112	Yemen	22.5	10.2	28.9	70.4	20.9	38.7	14.9	14.4

== Vision ==
"The Democracy Ranking is interested in contributing to the global enhancement of the Quality of Democracy in a world-wide understanding and approach."

== Theory, conceptual formula and methodology ==
The Democracy Ranking initiative applies the following conceptual formula for defining democracy and measuring the quality of democracy:

Quality of Democracy = (freedom & other characteristics of the political system) & (performance of the non-political dimensions).

This approach includes also the output of democracies. Democracy Ranking refers to countries (country-based democracies) with a population of one million or more and that are classified by Freedom House as "free" or at least as "partly free" (see also the Freedom House report). The Democracy Ranking makes explicit the "theoretical basis", which governs the theoretical self-understanding of the Democracy Ranking.

The Democracy Ranking understands and measures democracies in a multi-dimensional framework and approach. By this, the Democracy Ranking contributes to a further development of measurement of democracy. According to the ranking, democracy consists of six dimensions (one political, five non-political), with different weights for the overall quality of democracy. Their weights are distributed accordingly:

1. politics (or the political system) 50%;
2. gender (gender equality in socioeconomic and educational terms) 10%;
3. economy (or the economic system) 10%;
4. knowledge (knowledge society, research and education) 10%;
5. health (or the health system and health status) 10%;
6. and environment (environmental sustainability) 10%.

The theoretical basis of the Democracy Ranking encourages a broader approach for explaining and measuring democracy while covering and integrating non-political dimensions. This is enabled by an understanding that democracy represents not only a concept of the political system, but also a concept that extends to society and the context of society, and includes interfaces between politics, society, economy, and even the environment. Politics (policy) has or should have a responsibility for economic (socioeconomic) performance. Furthermore, there is also a need that democracy reflects the context of the (natural) environment.

Concepts of democracy turn out to be more demanding, the more they move from a mainly electoral democracy (emphasizing elections and political rights) to a liberal democracy (also encompassing civil liberties), and further extending to a liberal democracy of an advanced high quality. In that logic, the Democracy Ranking reflects and requires a "demanding type" of democracy.

Methodically, the Democracy Ranking does not create new indicators, but relies on already existing indicators that are being released regularly by renowned international and/or private non-profit organizations. The Democracy Ranking draws on available indicators according to a distinct conceptual formula and six-fold dimensional structure, thus providing a theoretically based conceptual design (a basic concept) of how to combine and aggregate these indicators. Depending on the source, the content of the indicators varies, extending from peer review assessment (Democracy indices) to indicators that capture performance (e.g., socioeconomic behavior). The Democracy Ranking initiative acknowledges the work of organizations such as Freedom House, the World Bank, and also the United Nations Development Program (more specifically the Human Development Index).

== Reflections on the Democracy Ranking ==
The work of the Democracy Ranking is being reflected in academic discourse and in coverage by international media.

== Democracy Ranking ==
The Democracy Ranking analyzes several-year intervals, revealing relative ranking positions as well as changes of score levels over time. Typically, more than hundred countries are being compared in context of a specific Democracy Ranking. Based on ranking results and their shifts, a Democracy Improvement Ranking is being carried out, with a full result release. The Democracy Improvement Ranking places the emphasis on increases or decreases of the ranking scores of democracies. Individual annual rankings of the Democracy Ranking are also published in separate book volumes.

== See also ==
- Democracy indices
- Democracy
- Democracy-Dictatorship Index
- Democracy Index
- Human Development Index
- Polity IV
- United Nations Development Program
- World Bank
