= Democracy indices =

Overview of democracy indicators

Democracy indices, also known as democracy rankings, are quantitative and comparative indicators of the state of democracy in different countries. Based on differing conceptions of democracy, they allow democratic development to be assessed and tracked over time.

Democracy indices differ in whether they are categorical, such as classifying countries into democracies, hybrid regimes, and autocracies, or continuous, assigning scores along a scale. The quantitative nature of democracy indices enables data-analytical approaches to studying the causal mechanisms of regime transformation processes. Democracy indices differ in which aspects of democracy they include and how heavily they weight each one. These aspects include the breadth and strength of core democratic institutions, freedom of expression, the competitiveness and inclusiveness of polyarchy, governance quality, adherence to democratic norms, co-option of opposition. Some indices also take into account practices that undermine democracy, such as electoral system manipulation, electoral fraud, and popular support of anti-democratic alternatives. Scholars have criticized democracy indices on several grounds, including the fundamental difficulty of defining democracy as well as methodological concerns.

== Prominent democracy indices ==
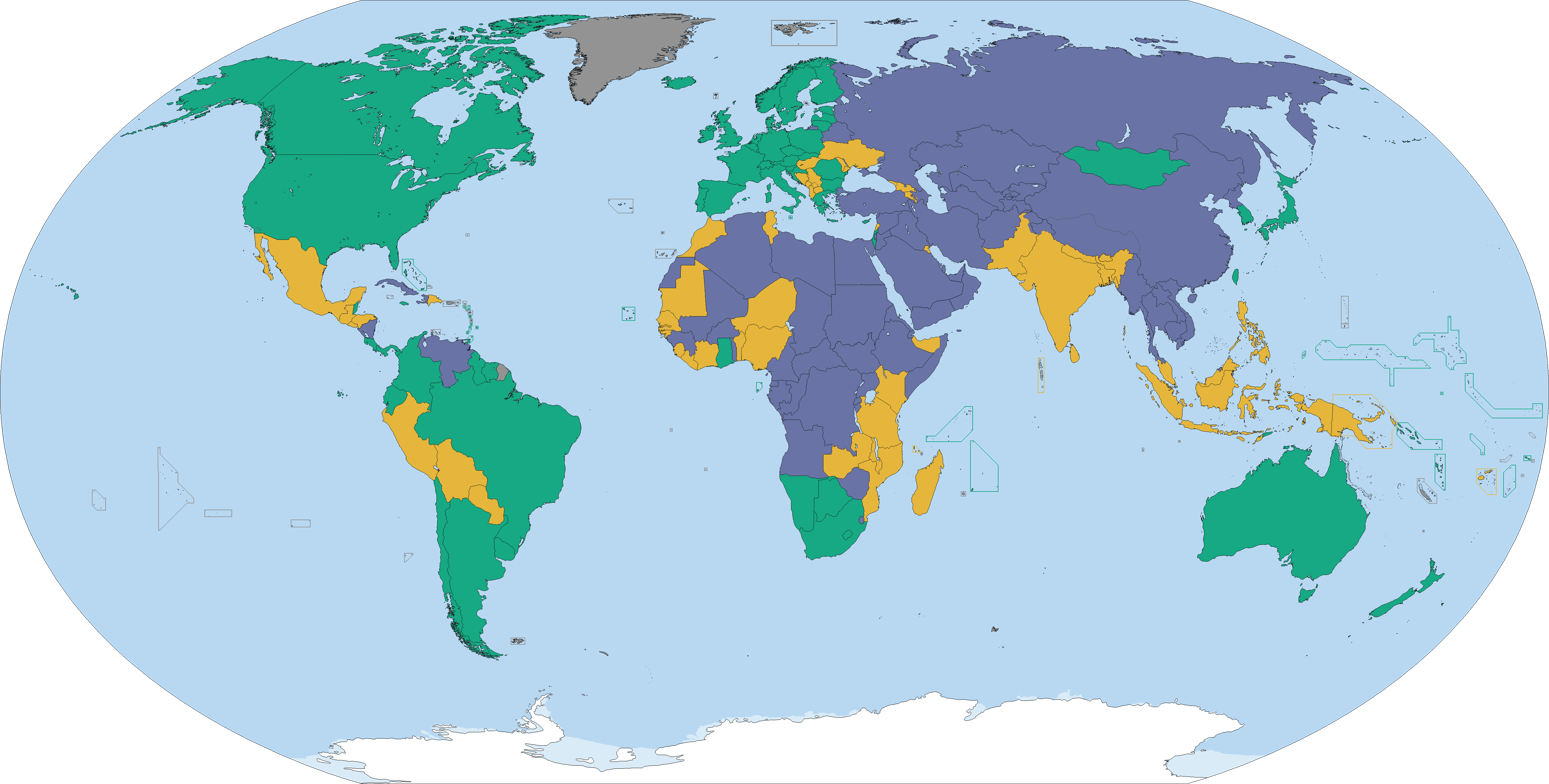
Country ratings from Freedom House's Freedom in the World survey map for 2022

The Economist's EIU Democracy Index map for 2024

V-Dem Electoral Democracy Index map for 2025

V-Dem Electoral and Liberal Democracy Indices for the world, 1790–

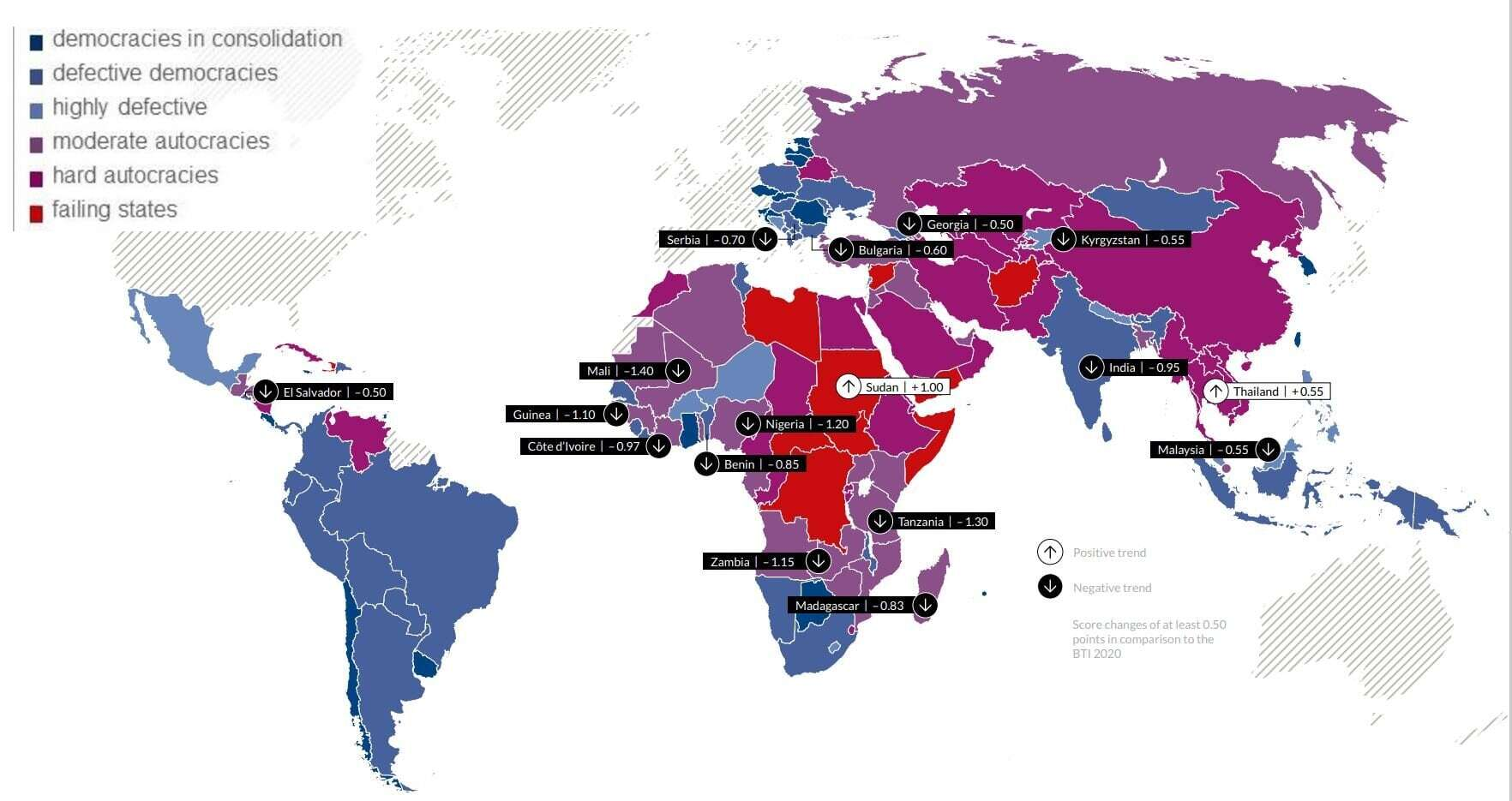
Global trend report analyzes the results of the Bertelsmann Transformation Index 2022

- Freedom in the World, a yearly survey and report by the U.S.-based non-governmental organization Freedom House. It measures the degree of civil liberties and political rights in the world nations. Depending on the ratings, the nations are then classified as "Free", "Partly Free", or "Not Free". The Freedom House has historically largely been funded by the U.S.-government.
- The Economist Democracy Index, by the UK-based Economist Intelligence Unit (EIU), is an assessment of countries' democracy. Countries are rated as "full democracies", "flawed democracies", "hybrid regimes", or "authoritarian regimes". The index is based on five categories measuring "electoral processes and pluralism", "functioning of government", "civil liberties", "political participation" and "political culture".
- The V-Dem Democracy Indices, by the V-Dem Institute (University of Gothenburg), distinguishes between five high-level principles of democracy: "electoral", "liberal", "participatory", "deliberative" and "egalitarian", and quantifies these principles. The V-Dem Democracy indices include the Citizen-initiated component of direct popular vote index, which indicates the strength of some aspects of "direct democracy" and the presidentialism index, which indicates higher concentration of political power in the hands of one individual.
- The Bertelsmann Transformation Index, by the Bertelsmann Stiftung, evaluates the development status and governance of political and economic transformation processes on the path to constitutional democracy and a market economy for developing and transition countries around the world. Bertelsmann Transformation Index categorizes countries into: hard-line autocracy, moderate autocracy, very defective democracy, defective democracy, and consolidating democracy.
- The Global State of Democracy Indices, by the International Institute for Democracy and Electoral Assistance, assesses democratic performance using different types of sources: expert surveys, standards-based coding by research groups and analysts, observational data and composite measures.
- The Democracy Perception Index, published annually by the Alliance of Democracies, claims to be the world's largest annual survey on how people perceive the state of democracy (cf. the Corruption Perceptions Index (CPI) by Transparency International, which similarly seeks to measure the perceived levels of public-sector corruption).

=== Projects ===
- The Referendum Database (RDB, since 2022), a database with information on direct democracy institutions such as referendum and initiative, or of those of representative democracies, authoritarian or totalitarian regimes such as plebiscites (referendums from above), as well as their use in popular votes with Varieties of Referendums (V-Ref, integrity of referendums, indicators for measuring their quality, a 2026–2029 project financed by SNF and DFG) of the Centre for Research on Direct Democracy (c2d / C2D) at the Centre for Democracy Aarau (ZDA).

One of their main reports already published is The World of Referendums (WoR), Yearly Referendum Database (RDB) report series.
RDB is a further development of the c2d database of the Centre for Research on Direct Democracy (c2d) founded 1993 by Andreas Auer at the University of Geneva (in 2007 Auer also co-founded the ZDA in Aarau and moved the c2d there).

- The Democracy Barometer, of the Centre for Democracy Aarau (ZDA) and the Department of Political Science at the University of Zurich, measures the quality of (so far) some of the established democracies with comparative data on the principles of "freedom" ("individual liberties", "rule of law", "public sphere"), "control" ("competition", "mutual constraints", "governmental capability"), "equality" ("transparency", "participation", "representation"), lists the indicators used to calculate these principles and produces Country reports and additional materials (codebook, methodology).

=== Indices measuring aspects of democracy ===
- The Effective Number of Parties is an index of the adjusted number of political parties in a country's party system.
- The Electoral Integrity Project surveys academics on the perceived electoral integrity of countries and subnational entities

Fragile States Index 2005–2013

- The Fragile States Index, formerly the Failed States Index, is an annual report that aims to assess states' vulnerability to conflict or collapse, ranking all sovereign states with membership in the United Nations where there is enough data available for analysis.
- The Gallagher index measures an electoral system's relative disproportionality between votes received and seats in a legislature.
- The Pedersen index is a measure of political volatility in party systems.
- The government distance measures the substantive political representation congruence as the political distance between the government and the median voter.

Other measured aspects of democracy include voter turnout, efficiency gap, wasted vote, and political efficacy.

=== Historical ===
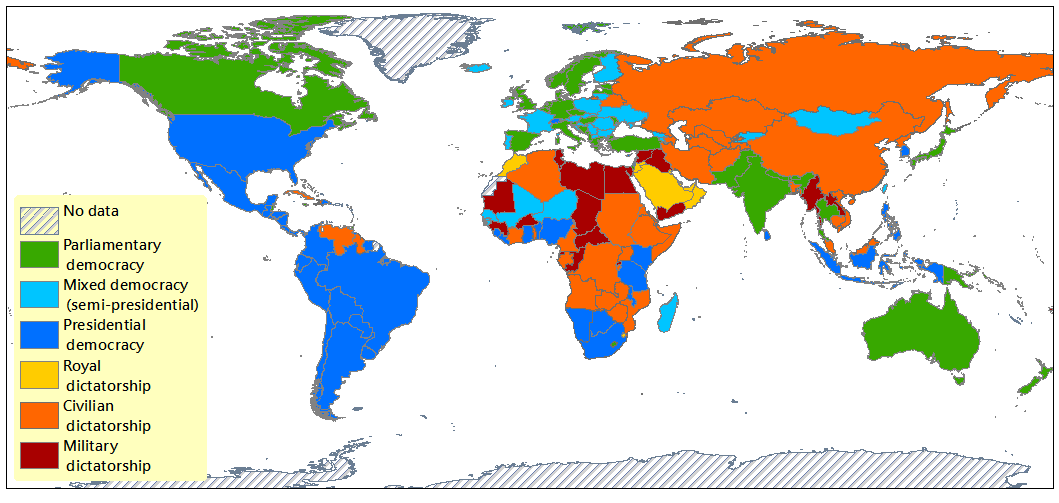
Democracy-Dictatorship Index in 2008

- The Democracy-Dictatorship Index was a binary measure of democracy and dictatorship.
- The Democracy Ranking was a democracy ranking by the Association for Development and Advancement of the Democracy Award.
- The Polity data series contains annual information on regime authority characteristics and covers the years 1800–2018 based on competitiveness, openness, and level of participation, sponsored by the Political Instability Task Force (PITF).
- Boix-Miller-Rosato dichotomous coding of democracy, easy-to-observe characteristics, few evaluations by own researchers based on academic literature. As a classification: non-democracy to democracy.
- Lexical Index of Electoral Democracy (LIED) by Skaaning et al. democracy's characteristics assessed with easy-to-observe characteristics, few evaluations by own researchers based on academic research, and evaluating whether necessary characteristics are present.
- The Index of Democratization created by Tatu Vanhanen.

== Measuring democracy ==
=== Difficulties in measuring democracy ===
Democracy is a multifaceted concept encompassing the functioning of diverse institutions, many of which are challenging to measure. As a result, limitations arise in analyzing democracy's potential impacts or its relationships with other phenomena, such as inequality, poverty, and education. etc. Given the challenges of obtaining reliable data on within-country variations in aspects of democracy, much of the academic focus has been on cross-country comparisons. However, significant variations in democratic institutions can exist within individual countries, highlighting the limitations of such an approach.

Another dimension of the difficulty in measuring democracy lies in the ongoing debate between minimalist and maximalist definitions of democracy. A minimalist conception of democracy defines democracy by primarily considering the essence of democracy; such as electoral procedures. A maximalist definition of democracy can include outcomes, such as economic or administrative efficiency, into measures of democracy. Some aspects of democracy, such as responsiveness or accountability, are generally not included in democracy indices due to the difficulty measuring these aspects. Other aspects, such as judicial independence or quality of the electoral system, are included in some democracy indices but not in others.

Some measures of democracy, such as Freedom House and Polity IV, adopt a maximalist understanding of democracy by analyzing indicators that extend beyond mere electoral procedures. These measures aim to capture broader dimensions of democratic governance, reflecting a more comprehensive view of political systems. These measures attempt to gauge contestation and inclusion; two features Robert Dahl argued are essential in democracies that successfully promote accountable governments. The democratic rating given by these mainstream measures can vary greatly depending on the indicators and evidence they deploy. The definition of democracy utilized by these measures is important because of the discouraging and alienating power such ratings can have, particularly when determined by indicators which are biased toward Western democracies.

Dieter Fuchs and Edeltraud Roller argue that accurately measuring the quality of democracy requires complementing objective metrics with subjective measurements that reflect the perspectives and experiences of citizens. Similarly, Quinton Mayne and Brigitte Geißel also defend that the quality of democracy does not depend exclusively on the performance of institutions, but also on the citizens' own dispositions and commitment.

=== Critiques of measures of democracy ===
Data on democracy, and particularly global indices of democracy, and the data they rely on, have been the subject of scrutiny and criticized by various scholars. Gerardo L. Munck and Jay Verkuilen for instance, have raised concerns about the methods used by prominent democracy indices such as Freedom House and Polity, such as the concept of democracy they measured, the design of indicators, and the aggregation rule. Political scientists Andrew T. Little and Anne Meng "highlight measurement concerns regarding time-varying bias in expert-coded data" such as Freedom House and V-Dem and encourage improving expert-coding practices. Knutsen et al. did not see evidence for time-varying bias in their expert-coded data and note the application of item response theory, factor analysis and estimates of uncertainties to limit expert biases while discussing concerns in operationalization of observer-invariant measures of democracy.

== Problems and challenges of measuring democracy ==
Quality of democracy – and the problems of measuring it

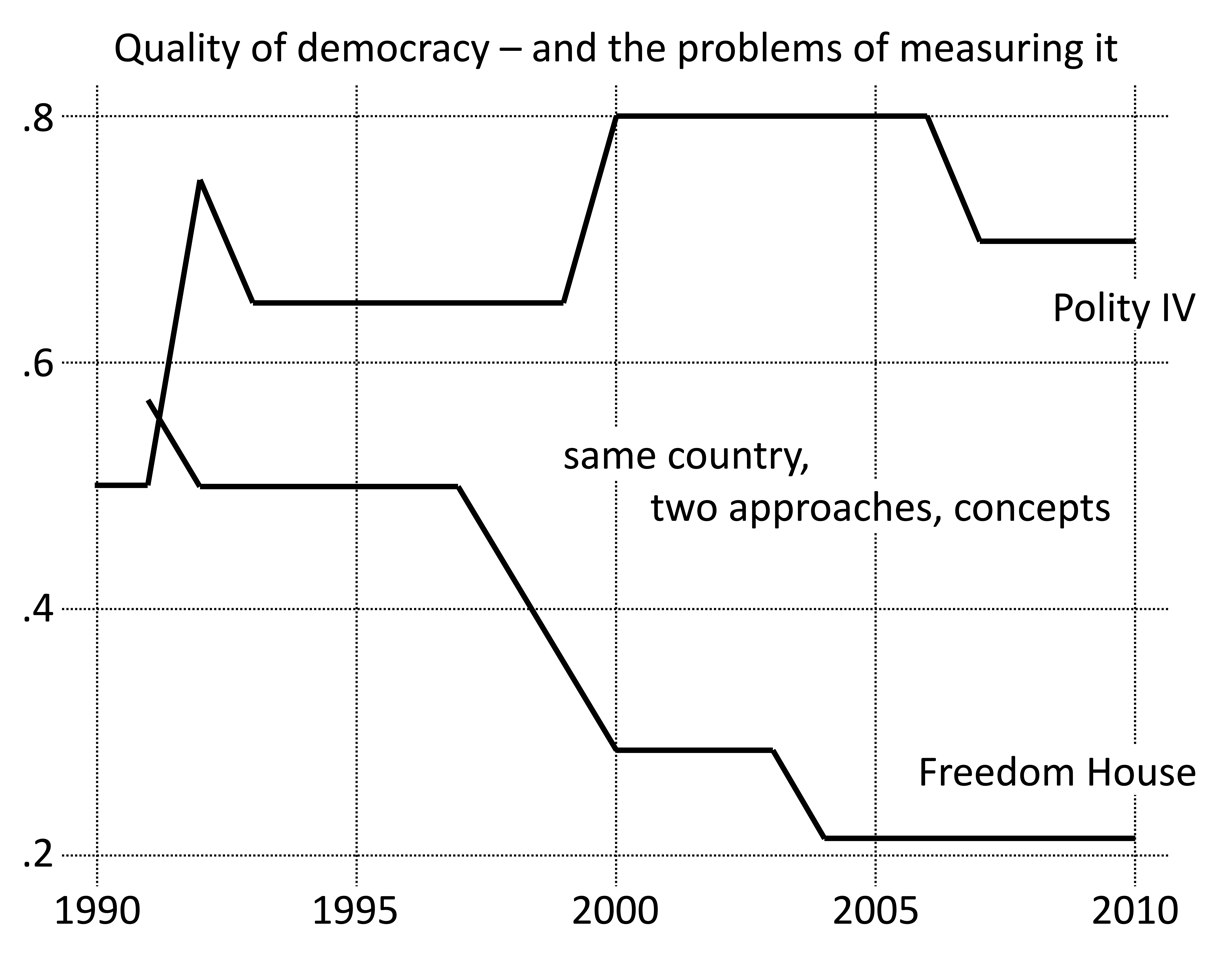
Same country (Russia), two approaches, concepts: Polity IV vs Freedom House

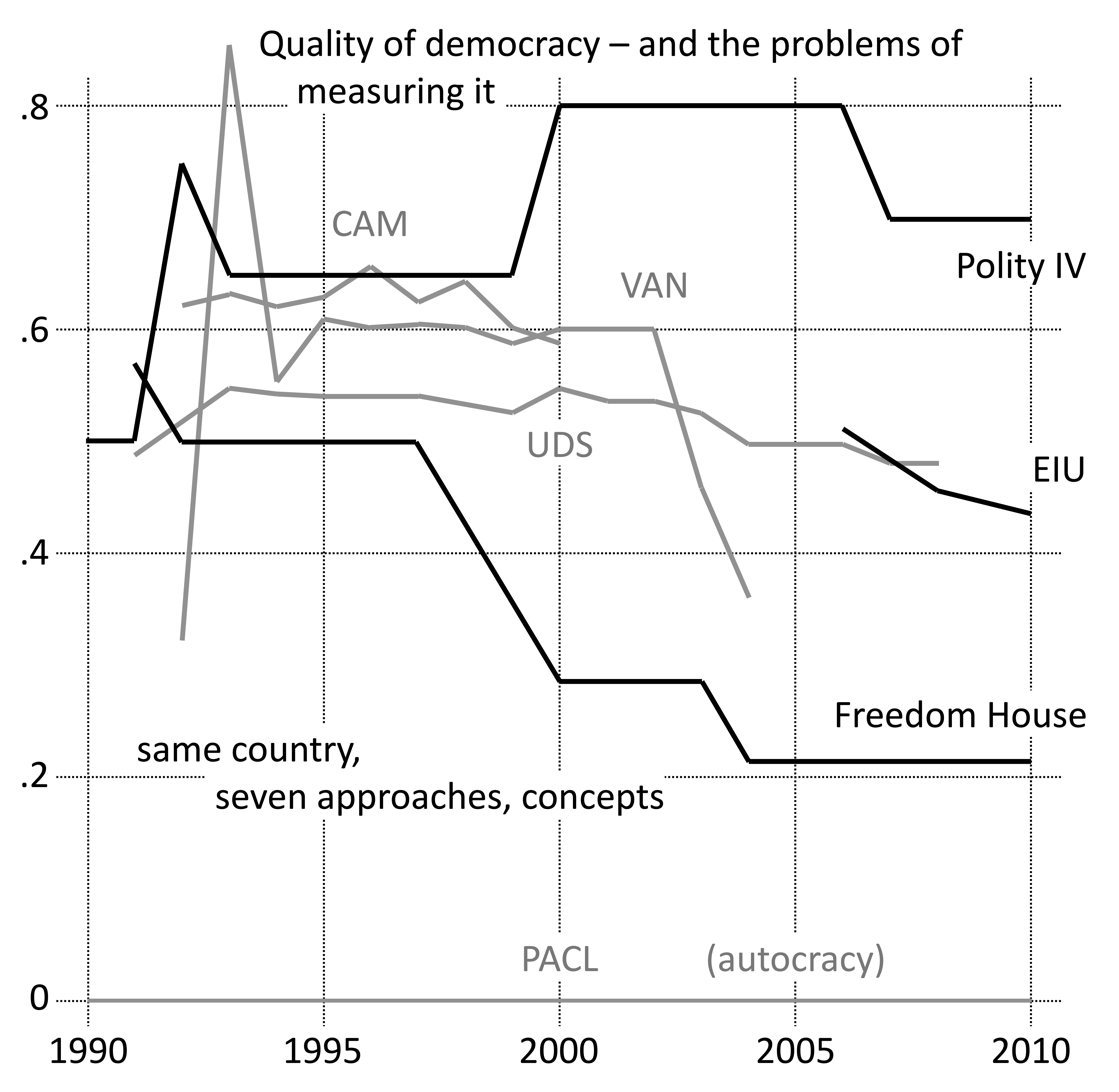
Same country (Russia), seven approaches, concepts: Polity IV, Freedom House, Democracy Index (EIU), Coppedge-Alvarez-Maldonado (CAM), Vanhanen's Index (VAN), Unified Democracy Scores (UDS), DD index (PACL)

There is no single universally accepted method for conceptualizing and designating regimes, including democratic, authoritarian and totalitarian regimes. Different democracy indices use different definitions and criteria, which can affect comparisons between countries over time.

In 2015, Seva Gunitsky wrote in the Washington Post, based upon his research for Ranking the World – Grading States as a Tool of Global Governance, that measuring democracy can mislead as much as clarify – a problem for academics, policy-makers and anyone who cares about democracy. In the chapter Lost in the Gray Zone: Competing Measures of Democracy in the Former Soviet Republics he, on the example of former Soviet republics, examines fundamental problems with measures of democracy, observing that indices often disagree and occasionally draw contradictory conclusions from observing the same event. He argues that this reflects inherent tradeoffs in conceptualizing democratic governance, which arise from fundamental normative disagreements about a highly contested concept.

=== Conceptualizing and measuring democracy ===
In 2011, Michael Coppedge and John Gerring et al. proposed an approach to such conceptualization and measurement. In their paper Conceptualizing and Measuring Democracy: A New Approach they review some of the weaknesses among contemporary and older approaches, then lay out their approach.

The authors propose to create a new set of indicators, four features, considered together, to conceptualize and measure democracy. First, historical, extending indicators of democracy back through modern history, wherever possible. Second, a multidimensional approach to the problem of conceptualizing democracy. Third, to collect information relevant to democracy at a highly disaggregated level. Fourth, transparent, a strategy for data collection and presentation that should enhance the precision, validity, transparency, and legitimacy of the resulting indicators.

They also sum up the conceptions or aspects of democracy into six traits – electoral, liberal, majoritarian, participatory, deliberative, and egalitarian – which taken together offer a fairly comprehensive accounting of the concept of democracy as it is employed today (see overview in the table below).

Conceptions of democracy – overview (Michael Coppedge, John Gerring et al., 2011)
		Principles	Question	Institutions
I.	Electoral (aka elite, minimal, realist, Schumpeterian)	Contestation, competition	Are government offices filled by free and fair multiparty elections?	Elections, political parties, competitiveness and turnover
II.	Liberal (aka consensus, pluralist)	Limited government, multiple veto points, horizontal accountability, individual rights, civil liberties, transparency	Is political power decentralized & constrained?	Multiple, independent, and decentralized, with special focus on the role of the media, interest groups, the judiciary, and a written constitution with explicit guarantees
III.	Majoritarian (aka responsible party government)	Majority rule, centralization, vertical accountability	Does the majority (or plurality) rule?	Consolidated and centralized, with special focus on the role of political parties
IV.	Participatory	Government by the people	Do ordinary citizens participate in politics?	Election law, civil society, local government, direct democracy
V.	Deliberative	Government by reason	Are political decisions the product of public deliberation?	Media, hearings, panels, other deliberative bodies
VI.	Egalitarian	Political equality	Are all citizens equally empowered?	Designed to ensure equal participation, representation, protection, and politically relevant resources

== See also ==
- Corruption Perception Index
- Democratic backsliding by country
- Democratic transition
- Types of democracy
- List of international rankings
- List of freedom indices
- List of globalization-related indices
- List of countries by system of government
- List of forms of government
