= Polity data series =

Political science project ranking states by democraticity

Number of nations 1800–2018 scoring 8 or higher on the Polity5 scale, a measure of democracy

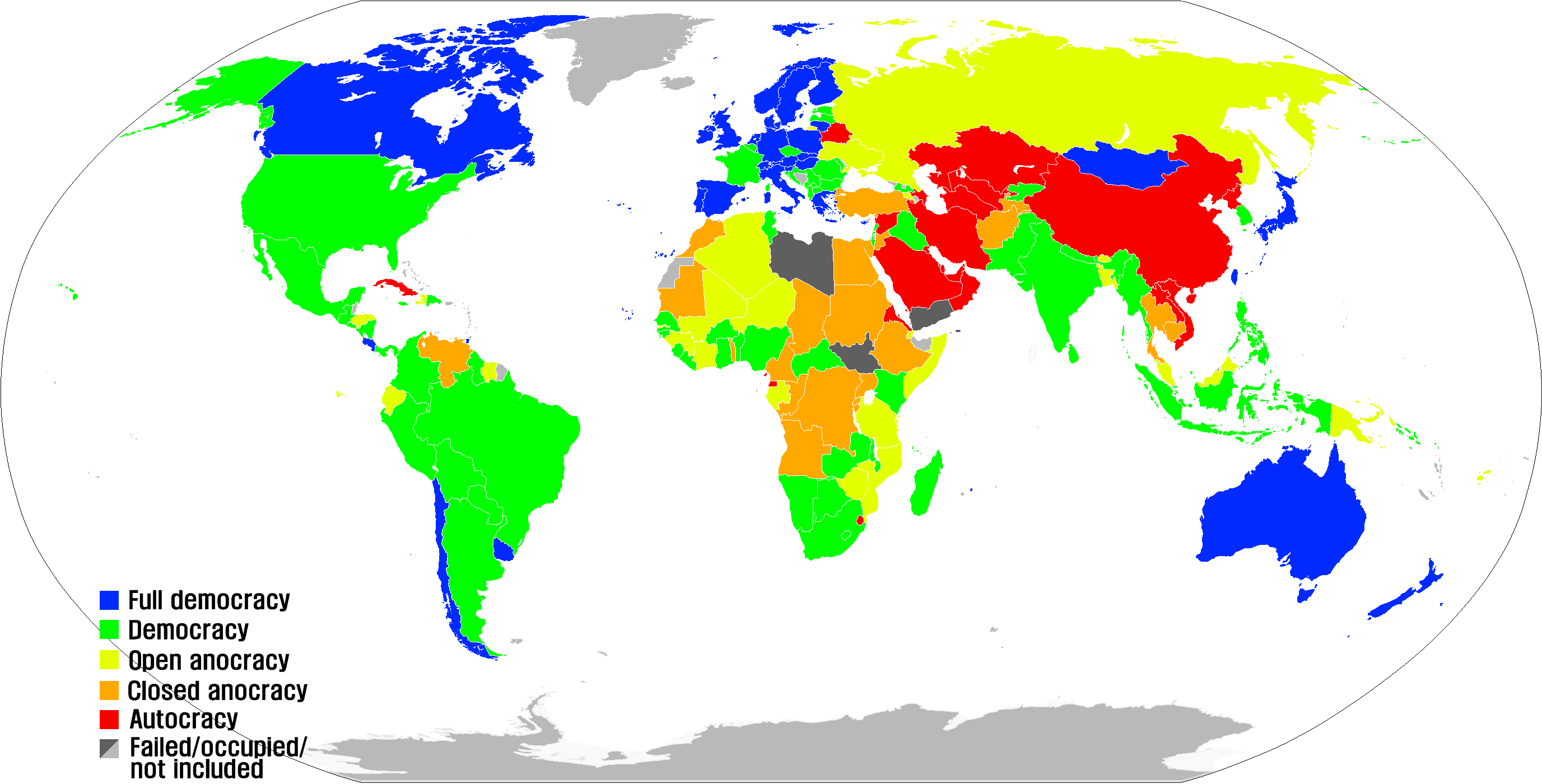
World map showing findings from the Polity IV data series report for 2017

The Polity data series is a data series in political science research. Along with the V-Dem Democracy Indices project and The Economist Democracy Index, Polity is among prominent datasets that measure democracy and autocracy.

The Polity study was initiated in the late 1960s by Ted Robert Gurr and is now continued by Monty G. Marshall, one of Gurr's students. It was sponsored by the Political Instability Task Force (PITF) until February 2020. The PITF is funded by the Central Intelligence Agency.

The data series has been criticized for its methodology, Americentrism, and connections to the CIA. Seva Gunitsky, an assistant professor at the University of Toronto, stated that the data series was appropriate "for research that examines constraints on governing elites, but not for studying the expansion of suffrage over the nineteenth century".

== Scoring chart ==
Polity Score ranges from -10 to +10
Polity score range	10	6 to 9	1 to 5	−5 to 0	−10 to −6
Regime type	Full Democracy	Democracy	Open Anocracy	Closed Anocracy	Autocracy

== Scores for 2018 ==
Country	Democracy score	Autocracy score	Polity IV score	Polity IV regime type
Afghanistan	1	2	−1	Closed Anocracy
Albania	9	0	9	Democracy
Algeria	3	1	2	Open Anocracy
Angola	2	4	−2	Closed Anocracy
Argentina	9	0	9	Democracy
Armenia	7	0	7	Democracy
Australia	10	0	10	Full Democracy
Austria	10	0	10	Full Democracy
Azerbaijan	0	7	−7	Autocracy
Bahrain	0	10	−10	Autocracy
Bangladesh	0	6	−6	Autocracy
Belarus	0	7	−7	Autocracy
Belgium	8	0	8	Democracy
Benin	7	0	7	Democracy
Bhutan	7	0	7	Democracy
Bolivia	7	0	7	Democracy
Botswana	8	0	8	Democracy
Brazil	8	0	8	Democracy
Bulgaria	9	0	9	Democracy
Burkina Faso	7	1	6	Democracy
Burundi	2	3	−1	Closed Anocracy
Cambodia	0	4	−4	Closed Anocracy
Cameroon	1	5	−4	Closed Anocracy
Canada	10	0	10	Full Democracy
Cape Verde	10	0	10	Full Democracy
Central African Republic	7	1	6	Democracy
Chad	1	3	−2	Closed Anocracy
Chile	10	0	10	Full Democracy
China	0	7	−7	Autocracy
Colombia	7	0	7	Democracy
Comoros	0	3	−3	Closed Anocracy
(Republic of the Congo) Congo Brazzaville	0	4	−4	Closed Anocracy
(Democratic Republic of the Congo) Congo Kinshasa	1	4	−3	Closed Anocracy
Costa Rica	10	0	10	Full Democracy
Croatia	9	0	9	Democracy
Cuba	1	6	−5	Closed Anocracy
Cyprus	10	0	10	Full Democracy
Czech Republic	9	0	9	Democracy
Denmark	10	0	10	Full Democracy
Djibouti	3	0	3	Open Anocracy
Dominican Republic	8	1	7	Democracy
East Timor	9	1	8	Democracy
Ecuador	6	1	5	Open Anocracy
Egypt	0	4	−4	Closed Anocracy
El Salvador	8	0	8	Democracy
Equatorial Guinea	0	6	−6	Autocracy
Eritrea	0	7	−7	Autocracy
Estonia	9	0	9	Democracy
Ethiopia	3	2	1	Open Anocracy
Fiji	4	0	4	Open Anocracy
Finland	10	0	10	Full Democracy
France	9	0	9	Democracy
Gabon	4	1	3	Open Anocracy
(The Gambia) Gambia	4	0	4	Open Anocracy
Georgia	8	1	7	Democracy
Germany	10	0	10	Full Democracy
Ghana	8	0	8	Democracy
Greece	10	0	10	Full Democracy
Guatemala	9	1	8	Democracy
Guinea	4	0	4	Open Anocracy
Guinea-Bissau	7	1	6	Democracy
Guyana	8	1	7	Democracy
Haiti	6	1	5	Open Anocracy
Honduras	7	0	7	Democracy
Hungary	10	0	10	Full Democracy
India	9	0	9	Democracy
Indonesia	9	0	9	Democracy
Iran	0	7	−7	Autocracy
Iraq	6	0	6	Democracy
Ireland	10	0	10	Full Democracy
Israel	7	1	6	Democracy
Italy	10	0	10	Full Democracy
Ivory Coast	5	1	4	Open Anocracy
Jamaica	9	0	9	Democracy
Japan	10	0	10	Full Democracy
Jordan	2	5	−3	Closed Anocracy
Kazakhstan	0	6	−6	Autocracy
Kenya	9	0	9	Democracy
Kosovo	8	0	8	Democracy
Kuwait	0	7	−7	Autocracy
Kyrgyzstan	8	0	8	Democracy
Laos	0	7	−7	Autocracy
Latvia	8	0	8	Democracy
Lebanon	6	0	6	Democracy
Lesotho	9	1	8	Democracy
Liberia	8	1	7	Democracy
Lithuania	10	0	10	Full Democracy
Luxembourg	10	0	10	Full Democracy
Republic of Macedonia	9	0	9	Democracy
Madagascar	6	0	6	Democracy
Malawi	6	0	6	Democracy
Malaysia	7	0	7	Democracy
Mali	6	1	5	Open Anocracy
Mauritania	0	2	−2	Closed Anocracy
Mauritius	10	0	10	Full Democracy
Mexico	8	0	8	Democracy
Moldova	9	0	9	Democracy
Mongolia	10	0	10	Full Democracy
Montenegro	9	0	9	Democracy
Morocco	1	5	−4	Closed Anocracy
Mozambique	6	1	5	Open Anocracy
Myanmar	8	0	8	Democracy
Namibia	6	0	6	Democracy
Nepal	8	1	7	Democracy
Netherlands	10	0	10	Full Democracy
New Zealand	10	0	10	Full Democracy
Nicaragua	7	1	6	Democracy
Niger	6	1	5	Open Anocracy
Nigeria	8	1	7	Democracy
North Korea	0	10	−10	Autocracy
Norway	10	0	10	Full Democracy
Oman	0	8	−8	Autocracy
Pakistan	7	0	7	Democracy
Panama	9	0	9	Democracy
Papua New Guinea	5	0	5	Open Anocracy
Paraguay	9	0	9	Democracy
Peru	9	0	9	Democracy
Philippines	8	0	8	Democracy
Poland	10	0	10	Full Democracy
Portugal	10	0	10	Full Democracy
Qatar	0	10	−10	Autocracy
Romania	9	0	9	Democracy
Russia	5	1	4	Open Anocracy
Rwanda	0	3	−3	Closed Anocracy
Saudi Arabia	0	10	−10	Autocracy
Senegal	7	0	7	Democracy
Serbia	9	1	8	Democracy
Sierra Leone	8	1	7	Democracy
Singapore	2	4	−2	Closed Anocracy
(Slovakia) Slovak Republic	10	0	10	Full Democracy
Slovenia	10	0	10	Full Democracy
Solomon Islands	9	1	8	Democracy
Somalia	5	0	5	Open Anocracy
South Africa	9	0	9	Democracy
South Korea	8	0	8	Democracy
Spain	10	0	10	Full Democracy
Sri Lanka	7	1	6	Democracy
Sudan	0	4	−4	Closed Anocracy
Suriname	6	1	5	Open Anocracy
Swaziland	0	9	−9	Autocracy
Sweden	10	0	10	Full Democracy
Switzerland	10	0	10	Full Democracy
Syria	0	9	−9	Autocracy
Taiwan	10	0	10	Full Democracy
Tajikistan	1	4	−3	Closed Anocracy
Tanzania	4	1	3	Open Anocracy
Thailand	0	3	−3	Closed Anocracy
Togo	1	3	−2	Closed Anocracy
Trinidad and Tobago	10	0	10	Full Democracy
Tunisia	7	0	7	Democracy
Turkey	0	4	−4	Closed Anocracy
Turkmenistan	0	8	−8	Autocracy
Uganda	1	2	−1	Closed Anocracy
Ukraine	5	1	4	Open Anocracy
United Arab Emirates	0	8	−8	Autocracy
United Kingdom	8	0	8	Democracy
United States	8	0	8	Democracy
Uruguay	10	0	10	Full Democracy
Uzbekistan	0	9	−9	Autocracy
Venezuela	1	4	−3	Closed Anocracy
Vietnam	0	7	−7	Autocracy
Zambia	6	0	6	Democracy
Zimbabwe	5	1	4	Open Anocracy

== Criticism ==
The 2002 paper "Conceptualizing and Measuring Democracy" claimed several problems with commonly used democracy rankings, including Polity, opining that the criteria used to determine "democracy" were misleadingly narrow.

The Polity data series has been criticized by Fairness & Accuracy in Reporting for its methodology and determination of what is and isn't a democracy. FAIR has criticized the data series for Americentrism with the United States being shown as the only democracy in the world in 1842, being given a nine out of ten during slavery, and a ten out of ten during the Jim Crow era. The organization has also been critical of the data series for ignoring European colonialism in Africa and Asia with those areas being labeled as no data before the 1960s. FAIR has also been critical of the data series' connection to the Central Intelligence Agency. Max Roser, the founder of Our World in Data, stated that Polity IV was far from perfect and was concerned at the data series' connections with the Central Intelligence Agency.

Seva Gunitsky, an assistant professor at the University of Toronto, wrote in The Washington Post where he stated that "Polity IV measures might be appropriate for research that examines constraints on governing elites, but not for studying the expansion of suffrage over the nineteenth century". Gunitsky was critical of the data series for ignoring suffrage.

== See also ==
- Democracy-Dictatorship Index
- Democracy Index
- Democracy Ranking
- V-Dem Democracy indices
- List of democracy indices
- List of freedom indices
- Freedom in the World
