= Types of democracy =

Types of democracy refers to the various governance structures that embody the principles of democracy ("rule by the people") in some way. Democracy is frequently applied to governments (ranging from local to global), but may also be applied to other constructs like workplaces, families, community associations, and so forth.

Types of democracy can cluster around values. Some such types, defined as direct democracy (or participatory democracy, or deliberative democracy), promote equal and direct participation in political decisions by all members of the public. Others, including the many variants of representative democracy (i.e., constitutional), favor more indirect or procedural approaches to collective self-governance, wherein decisions are made by elected representatives rather than by the people directly.

Types of democracy can be found across time, space, and language. The foregoing examples are just a few of the thousands of refinements of, and variations on, the central notion of "democracy."

== Direct democracy ==
A direct democracy, or pure democracy, is a type of democracy where the people govern directly, by voting on laws and policies. It requires wide participation of citizens in politics. Athenian democracy, or classical democracy, refers to a direct democracy developed in ancient times in the Greek city-state of Athens. A popular democracy is a type of direct democracy based on referendums and other devices of empowerment and concretization of popular will.

A participatory democracy or semi-direct democracy is a form of government in which citizens participate individually and directly in political decisions and policies that affect their lives, rather than through elected representatives.

An industrial democracy is an arrangement which involves workers making decisions, sharing responsibility and authority in the workplace (see also workplace).

== Representative democracies ==
A representative democracy is an indirect democracy where sovereignty is held by the people's representatives.

- A liberal democracy is a representative democracy with rule of law, protection for individual liberties and rights, and limitations on the power of the elected representatives.
- An illiberal democracy is a representative democracy with weak or no limits on the power of the elected representatives to rule as they please.

Subtypes of representative democracy include:

- Parliamentary system – a democratic system of government where the legislative branch (the parliament) appoints the executive branch (typically a cabinet), which is headed by a prime minister who is considered the head of government.
  - Westminster system – parliamentary system of government modeled after that of the United Kingdom, in which the prime minister is the head of the executive government yet subject to a non-executive head of state, typically a monarch, who provides ethical advice and serves as the titular head of the armed forces.
- Presidential system – a democratic system of government where the head of government is also head of state (typically a president) and leads an executive branch that is separate from the legislative branch.
  - Jacksonian democracy – a variant of presidential democracy popularized by U.S. president Andrew Jackson which promoted the strength of the executive branch and the presidency at the expense of Congressional power.

Representative democracies often contain political parties, which are groups of politicians with similar views who work together to win elections. Depending on how many major parties exist, a representative democracy can have one of the following party systems:

- Dominant-party system – a system where only one political party can realistically win enough votes to become the government, by itself or in a coalition government.
- Two-party system – a system where only two parties or alliances, typically placed either side of the center, have a realistic chance of winning a majority of votes. Other parties are very minor or solely regional.
- Multi-party system – a system in which multiple political parties have the capacity to gain control of government offices, separately or in coalition.
- Non-partisan system – a system in which universal and periodic elections (by secret ballot) take place without reference to political parties.

A demarchy is a form of government where people are randomly selected from the citizenry through sortition to either act as general governmental representatives or to make decisions in specific areas of governance (defense, environment, etc.).

An authoritarian democracy is a democracy where the ruler holds a considerable amount of power, but their rule benefits the people. The term was first used by supporters of Bonapartism.

== Types based on location ==
A cellular democracy, developed by Georgist libertarian economist Fred E. Foldvary, uses a multi-level bottom-up structure based on either small neighborhood governmental districts or contractual communities.

A workplace democracy refers to the application of democracy to the workplace (see also industrial democracy).

== Types based on ethnic influence ==
- Ethnic democracy
- Ethnocracy
- Herrenvolk democracy

== Religious democracies ==
A religious democracy is a form of government where the values of a particular religion have an effect on laws and policies, often when most of the population is a member of the religion. Examples include:

- Christian Democracy
- Gaṇasaṅgha
- Islamic democracy
- Jewish and Democratic State
- Theodemocracy

== Other types of democracy ==
Types of democracy include:

- Autocratic Democracy – where the party of the elected ruler will control the state unilaterally.
- Anticipatory democracy – relies on some degree of disciplined and usually market-informed anticipation of the future, to guide major decisions.
- Associationalism, or Associative Democracy – emphasis on freedom via voluntary and democratically self-governing associations.
- Adversialism, or Adversial Democracy – with an emphasis on freedom based on adversial relationships between individuals and groups as best expressed in democratic judicial systems.
- Bourgeois democracy – some Marxists, communists, socialists and anarchists refer to liberal democracy as bourgeois democracy, alleging that ultimately politicians fight only for the rights of the bourgeoisie.
- Consensus democracy – rule based on consensus rather than traditional majority rule.
- Constitutional democracy – governed by a constitution.
- Defensive democracy – a democracy that limits some rights and freedoms in order to protect its existence.
- Deliberative democracy – in which authentic deliberation, not only voting, is central to legitimate decision making. It adopts elements of both consensus decision-making and majority rule.
- Democratic centralism – an organizational method where members of a political party discuss and debate matters of policy and direction and after the decision is made by majority vote, all members are expected to follow that decision in public.
- Democratic dictatorship (also known as democratur)
- Democratic republic – republic which has democracy through elected representatives
- Democratic socialism – form of socialism ideologically opposed to the Marxist–Leninist styles that have become synonymous with socialism; democratic socialists place an emphasis on decentralized governance in political democracy with social ownership of the means of production and social and economic institutions with workers' self-management.
- Economic democracy – theory of democracy involving people having access to subsistence, or equity in living standards.
- Grassroots democracy – emphasizes trust in small decentralized units at the municipal government level, possibly using urban secession to establish the formal legal authority to make decisions made at this local level binding.
- Guided democracy – a form of democratic government with increased autocracy where citizens exercise their political rights without meaningfully affecting the government's policies, motives, and goals.
- Inclusive democracy – a left-libertarian formulation of democracy that includes democracy in the social, political, economic, and ecological spheres; primarily due to Greek philosopher Takis Fotopoulos.
- Interactive democracy – a proposed form of democracy utilising information technology to allow citizens to propose new policies, "second" proposals and vote on the resulting laws (that are refined by Parliament) in a referendum.
- Jeffersonian democracy – named after American statesman Thomas Jefferson, who believed in equality of political opportunity and opposed to privilege, aristocracy and corruption.
- Liquid democracy – a form of democratic control whereby voting power is vested in individual citizens who may self-select provisional delegates, rather than elected representatives.
- Market democracy – another name for democratic capitalism, an economic ideology based on a tripartite arrangement of a market-based economy based predominantly on economic incentives through free markets, a democratic polity and a liberal moral-cultural system which encourages pluralism.
- Military democracy -- a democracy with an elected and removable military leader, a council of elders and a popular assembly.
- Multiparty democracy – an electoral democracy where the people have free and fair elections and can choose between multiple political parties, unlike dictatorships that have usually one party that dominates the other parties or it is the only legally allowed party to rule.
- New Democracy – Maoist concept based on Mao Zedong's "Bloc of Four Classes" theory in post-revolutionary China.
- Participatory democracy – involves more lay citizen participation in decision making and offers greater political representation than traditional representative democracy, e.g., wider control of proxies given to representatives by those who get directly involved and actually participate.
- People's democracy – multi-class rule in which the proletariat dominates.
- Pseudo democracy – a type of system where voting and elections appear to be democratic but provide the citizenry with few or no other options than a particular leader. Some candidates are presented in such a way as to not be taken seriously. This form is often used in autocratic countries to give the illusion of democracy.
- Radical democracy – type of democracy that focuses on the importance of nurturing and tolerating difference and dissent in decision-making processes.
- Revolutionary democracy – ideology of the Ethiopian People's Revolutionary Democratic Front
- Semi-direct democracy – representative democracy with instruments, elements, and/or features of direct democracy.
- Social Cellular democracy – applied social network voting to build a bottom-up multi-tier scalable hierarchy - to arrive at a top-level Forum of the most trusted, wise, responsible members of a society. [</ref> https://blogs.timesofisrael.com/democracy-2-0-simple-protocol-israeli-relevancy/]
- Sociocracy – a democratic system of governance based on consent decision making, circle organization, subsidiarity, and double-linked representation.
- Social democracy – a political ideology advocating the use of democratic means to achieve a gradual transition to socialism.
- Socialist democracy – a political system which aligns socialism with democracy. This has encompassed a wide range of left wing ideologies which include Trotskyism, council communism, Leninism, social democracy, and democratic socialism.
- Whole-process people's democracy – political concept in China describing the people's participation in, and relationship to, governance under socialism with Chinese characteristics.

== See also ==
- Communalism
- Corsican Constitution
- Democracy
- Democracy Indices
- Democracy promotion
- Democracy Ranking
- Democratic capitalism
- Direct Action and Democracy Today
- Education Index
- The End of History and the Last Man
- Four boxes of liberty
- Fundación Global Democracia y Desarrollo (FUNGLODE)
- Global Foundation for Democracy and Development (GFDD)
- Holacracy
- International Centre for Democratic Transition
- Islam and democracy
- Isonomia
- Jewish and Democratic State
- Kleroterion
- Motion (democracy)
- National Democratic Institute for International Affairs
- United Front for Democracy Against Dictatorship
- Netherlands Institute for Multiparty Democracy
- Office for Democratic Institutions and Human Rights
- Penn, Schoen & Berland
- Polity data series
- Post-democracy
- Potsdam Declaration
- Public sphere
- Ratification
- Synoecism
- Trustee model of representation
- Vox populi
- Why Democracy?
- Workplace democracy
- World Bank's Inspection Panel
- World Forum for Democratization in Asia
- World Youth Movement for Democracy
- Constitutional economics
- Cosmopolitan democracy
- Community of Democracies
- Democracy promotion
- Democratic Peace Theory
- Democratization
- Direct Action and Democracy Today
- Empowered democracy
- Foucault/Habermas debate
- Freedom deficit
- Liberal democracy
- List of direct democracy parties
- Majority rule
- Media democracy
- Netocracy
- Poll
- Panarchy
- Polyarchy
- Sociocracy
- Sortition
- Subversion
- Rule According to Higher Law
- Voting

=== Further types ===
- Absolute democracy
- Bhutanese democracy
- Consensus democracy
- Guided democracy
- Interest group democracy
- Messianic democracy
- Monitory democracy
- Non-representative democracy
- Procedural democracy
- Sectarian democracy
- Sovereign democracy
- Substantive democracy
- Third Wave Democracy

== Bibliography ==
- Living Database of Democracy with Adjectives Gagnon, Jean-Paul. 2020. "Democracy with Adjectives Database, at 3539 entries". Latest entry April 8. Provided by the Foundation for the Philosophy of Democracy and the University of Canberra. Hosted by Cloudstor / Aarnet / Instaclustr.
- Appendix A: Types of Democracies M. Haas, Why Democracies Flounder and Fail, https://doi.org/10.1007/978-3-319-74070-6, June 2018
