= CIRI Human Rights Data Project =

From 2004 to 2014, the Cingranelli-Richards (CIRI) Human Rights Data Project annually rated the level of government respect for a variety of internationally recognized human rights. The final CIRI data set contains quantitative indicators of 15 human rights for 195 countries, annually from 1981 to 2011. The CIRI data were used in over 170 countries by scholars, students, policymakers, and analysts representing over 400 organizations. CIRI's founders and co-directors were political scientists David Cingranelli at Binghamton University, SUNY and David L. Richards at the University of Connecticut. K. Chad Clay at the University of Georgia joined as third co-director in 2013.

== Accessing the data ==
The CIRI data were free for not-for-profit users. Once registered, CIRI users could create customized datasets, choosing only the indicators, countries, and years they needed; or, they could download the entire data set. As of December 2007, CIRI began using its own numeric country identifier code, but continued to offer others for the purpose of data merging. The MyCIRI feature allowed users to store their datasets on the CIRI server and easily update them when the master CIRI data was updated.

== Financial support ==
Financial support for the CIRI Data Project came from the United States' National Science Foundation; The World Bank; GTZ; Binghamton University, SUNY; the Center on Democratic Performance at Binghamton University, SUNY; The Human Rights Institute and College of Liberal Arts & Sciences at The University of Connecticut.

== CIRI human rights indicators ==
The CIRI database coded only human rights PRACTICES of governments. The human rights for which government levels of respect were annually rated by CIRI included:

- Assembly & Association
- Disappearance
- Domestic Movement
- Electoral Self-Determination (formerly Political Participation & Free and Fair Elections)
- Empowerment Rights Index (An additive index summarizing government respect for electoral self-determination, domestic movement, foreign movement, religion, speech, assembly & association, and workers' rights)
- Extrajudicial killing
- Foreign Movement
- Independence of the Judiciary
- Physical Integrity Rights Index (An additive index summarizing government respect for disappearance, extrajudicial killing, political imprisonment, and torture)
- Political Imprisonment
- Religion
- Speech
- Torture
- Women's Economic Rights
- Women's Political Rights
- Women's Social Rights
- Workers' Rights

Most of the CIRI indicators were ratings (as opposed to rankings) on a scale of 0-2 for their respect of human rights, as follows:

- 0= Frequent violations of this right
- 1= Some violations of this right
- 2= No reported violations of this right

The CIRI database used the annual country reports from the US State Department and Amnesty International as its primary sources.

== Scores after 2011 ==
The CIRI Human Rights Data Project has not produced scores since 2011. The CIRIGHTS Data Project co-directed by David Cingranelli, Mikhail Filippov and Skip Mark has produced new annual scores using the CIRI coding methodology. The new scores are available from the Binghamton University Human Rights Institute website at www.binghamton.edu/institutes/hri/researcher-resources.html.

== See also ==
- List of freedom indices
