= V-Dem Democracy Indices =

Dataset of characteristics of political / rankings regimes

Electoral Democracy Index
2026

Liberal Democracy Index
2026

Liberal Component Index
2026

Participatory Component Index
2026

Deliberative Component Index
2026

Egalitarian Component Index
2026

0.90–1.00
0.80–0.89
0.70–0.79
0.60–0.69

0.50–0.59
0.40–0.49
0.30–0.39
0.20–0.29

0.10–0.19
0.00–0.09
No data

The Democracy Indices by V-Dem are democracy indices published by the independent research institute V-Dem Institute that describe qualities of different democracies. It is published annually.

Datasets analyze 251 indices and consist of 531 specific indicators (which are a set of fixed, multiple choice survey questions) focusing on both qualitative and quantitative measurements of democracy. These survey questions were carefully developed and adjusted during a concept and planning phase from 2008 to 2013, before the project officially went live with annual data collection in 2014. V-Dem utilizes historical data dating back to the 1800s for some countries, multiple coders for each question, and large measurement models. They use several key principles: electoral, liberal, majoritarian, consensual, participatory, deliberative, and egalitarian, with variables describing various aspects of government, especially on the quality of democracy, inclusivity, and other economic indicators. In 2025, the V-Dem index had 531 indicators and 251 high-level indices covering 202 polities from the period of 1789–2025. As of 2026, 74% of the world is under authoritarian rule.

The indices have faced criticism concerning the design and aggregation of indicators, potential time-varying bias in expert-coded data, and the reliance on expert assessments and methods used to estimate and limit associated uncertainties.

== Core indices ==
As of 2026, the V-Dem Institute published 531 indicators along with 251 indices and 62 other indicators. V-Dem publishes five core indices with several other supplementary indices that used as the source of core indices. The core indices are measuring "electoral", "liberal", "participatory", " deliberative" and "egalitarian" "democracies".

=== Electoral Democracy Index ===
This index measures the principle of electoral or representative democracy, including whether elections were free and fair, as well as the prevalence of a free and independent media. This index is part of all the other indices as a central component of democracy.

=== Liberal Democracy Index ===
This index incorporates measures of rule of law, checks and balances, and civil liberties along with the concepts measured in the electoral democracy index.

=== Participatory Democracy Index ===
This index measures the degree to which citizens participate in their own government through local democratic institutions, civil society organizations, direct democracy, and the concepts measured in the electoral democracy.

=== Deliberative Democracy Index ===
This index measures the degree to which decisions are made in the best interest of the people as opposed to due to coercion or narrow interest groups, in addition to the basic electoral democracy index.

=== Egalitarian Democracy Index ===
This index measures the level of equal access to resources, power, and freedoms across various groups within a society, in addition to the level of electoral democracy.

== By country ==
The authors of the V-Dem Institute's "Democracy Report 2026" state that the views and opinions expressed in the report are their own and do not reflect an official position of the larger V-Dem Project, the V-Dem Steering Committee, or the V-Dem Institute.

The table below shows 2026 V-Dem Democracy indices describing the year 2025.

The V-Dem dataset does not cover some countries, including Andorra, Antigua and Barbuda, the Bahamas, Belize, Brunei, Dominica, the Federated States of Micronesia, Grenada, Kiribati, Liechtenstein, the Marshall Islands, Monaco, Nauru, Palau, Saint Kitts and Nevis, Saint Lucia, Saint Vincent and the Grenadines, Samoa, San Marino, Tonga, Tuvalu, and Vatican City.

V-Dem Democracy Indices (16th edition)
Country	Democracy Indices		Democracy Component Indices			
Country	Electoral	Liberal	Liberal	Egalitarian	Participatory	Deliberative
Denmark	0.91	0.88	0.98	0.97	0.71	0.96
Norway	0.89	0.85	0.96	0.96	0.65	0.99
Sweden	0.89	0.85	0.98	0.9	0.65	0.93
Belgium	0.89	0.79	0.89	0.93	0.65	0.86
Ireland	0.89	0.82	0.93	0.87	0.63	0.91
Estonia	0.89	0.84	0.95	0.92	0.63	0.84
Switzerland	0.88	0.84	0.97	0.94	0.88	0.98
Luxembourg	0.87	0.78	0.89	0.95	0.56	0.97
France	0.86	0.8	0.94	0.81	0.63	0.93
Costa Rica	0.86	0.81	0.95	0.88	0.64	0.92
Uruguay	0.86	0.79	0.93	0.77	0.82	0.93
Finland	0.85	0.81	0.96	0.81	0.64	0.9
Czech Republic	0.85	0.79	0.95	0.91	0.59	0.81
New Zealand	0.85	0.79	0.94	0.85	0.61	0.72
Australia	0.84	0.79	0.96	0.85	0.73	0.93
Canada	0.84	0.74	0.87	0.7	0.64	0.79
Chile	0.84	0.78	0.95	0.73	0.62	0.93
Austria	0.84	0.76	0.91	0.86	0.63	0.87
Latvia	0.83	0.75	0.91	0.87	0.66	0.81
Netherlands	0.83	0.77	0.94	0.89	0.59	0.9
Germany	0.83	0.78	0.97	0.94	0.66	0.98
Spain	0.82	0.74	0.91	0.84	0.64	0.83
Portugal	0.82	0.72	0.87	0.7	0.57	0.84
Japan	0.82	0.73	0.9	0.94	0.56	0.9
South Korea	0.82	0.74	0.91	0.87	0.61	0.94
Iceland	0.81	0.72	0.9	0.92	0.65	0.88
Jamaica	0.8	0.68	0.84	0.81	0.58	0.87
Taiwan	0.8	0.7	0.89	0.88	0.8	0.86
Barbados	0.8	0.68	0.85	0.85	0.3	0.92
Lithuania	0.79	0.71	0.92	0.88	0.67	0.84
Trinidad and Tobago	0.79	0.67	0.85	0.84	0.57	0.74
Brazil	0.78	0.7	0.91	0.64	0.62	0.92
Malta	0.78	0.62	0.77	0.9	0.62	0.81
Sri Lanka	0.78	0.61	0.76	0.71	0.61	0.78
Suriname	0.78	0.63	0.78	0.74	0.58	0.78
Cyprus	0.77	0.66	0.86	0.9	0.56	0.78
United Kingdom	0.77	0.69	0.9	0.78	0.64	0.86
Poland	0.77	0.64	0.83	0.88	0.62	0.85
Seychelles	0.76	0.68	0.91	0.83	0.32	0.95
Cabo Verde	0.74	0.63	0.84	0.72	0.54	0.69
Italy	0.74	0.64	0.87	0.89	0.74	0.82
South Africa	0.74	0.63	0.86	0.65	0.56	0.9
Greece	0.74	0.57	0.74	0.87	0.61	0.82
Mauritius	0.74	0.64	0.87	0.76	0.59	0.92
East Timor	0.74	0.55	0.71	0.58	0.56	0.7
Dominican Republic	0.74	0.5	0.63	0.46	0.58	0.9
United States	0.74	0.57	0.75	0.57	0.64	0.61
Slovakia	0.73	0.57	0.76	0.75	0.64	0.37
Vanuatu	0.73	0.62	0.86	0.75	0.32	0.57
Panama	0.73	0.57	0.77	0.55	0.53	0.76
Ghana	0.71	0.61	0.86	0.64	0.4	0.82
Solomon Islands	0.7	0.54	0.76	0.57	0.55	0.48
Israel	0.69	0.59	0.85	0.78	0.6	0.71
Slovenia	0.69	0.59	0.85	0.88	0.7	0.9
Argentina	0.69	0.52	0.74	0.69	0.56	0.52
Croatia	0.69	0.59	0.87	0.78	0.62	0.7
Colombia	0.68	0.56	0.81	0.52	0.64	0.62
Peru	0.67	0.51	0.74	0.5	0.62	0.48
Botswana	0.66	0.52	0.76	0.69	0.47	0.43
Lesotho	0.66	0.51	0.76	0.72	0.55	0.71
Nepal	0.66	0.5	0.75	0.58	0.62	0.54
The Gambia	0.64	0.52	0.81	0.67	0.58	0.74
Guatemala	0.64	0.52	0.81	0.44	0.61	0.72
Montenegro	0.64	0.5	0.77	0.78	0.57	0.81
Namibia	0.63	0.52	0.82	0.46	0.47	0.7
Senegal	0.63	0.48	0.74	0.69	0.58	0.89
São Tomé and Príncipe	0.63	0.52	0.82	0.67	0.55	0.6
Kosovo	0.63	0.46	0.69	0.69	0.46	0.56
Armenia	0.61	0.37	0.53	0.78	0.42	0.55
Ecuador	0.61	0.39	0.57	0.33	0.74	0.53
Bolivia	0.6	0.35	0.51	0.6	0.64	0.27
Romania	0.6	0.46	0.75	0.66	0.65	0.38
Bulgaria	0.6	0.5	0.83	0.71	0.62	0.78
Liberia	0.6	0.42	0.65	0.59	0.46	0.81
Paraguay	0.58	0.38	0.59	0.29	0.52	0.45
Bhutan	0.57	0.46	0.79	0.81	0.55	0.9
Kenya	0.56	0.45	0.77	0.55	0.52	0.79
North Macedonia	0.56	0.37	0.61	0.61	0.56	0.61
Malawi	0.56	0.46	0.82	0.49	0.6	0.84
Maldives	0.56	0.42	0.72	0.61	0.49	0.72
Moldova	0.55	0.45	0.79	0.77	0.66	0.78
Mongolia	0.54	0.42	0.76	0.66	0.43	0.83
Guyana	0.52	0.33	0.57	0.7	0.46	0.37
Honduras	0.51	0.38	0.69	0.4	0.56	0.64
Fiji	0.51	0.4	0.75	0.68	0.43	0.77
Nigeria	0.5	0.31	0.54	0.56	0.57	0.63
Malaysia	0.5	0.36	0.64	0.71	0.53	0.66
Bosnia and Herzegovina	0.5	0.34	0.62	0.66	0.52	0.59
Zambia	0.5	0.38	0.71	0.44	0.65	0.81
Benin	0.49	0.32	0.59	0.74	0.49	0.53
Albania	0.48	0.38	0.74	0.67	0.52	0.38
Sierra Leone	0.47	0.35	0.67	0.65	0.58	0.9
Mexico	0.47	0.22	0.36	0.47	0.65	0.43
Papua New Guinea	0.47	0.38	0.78	0.43	0.51	0.43
Indonesia	0.46	0.3	0.56	0.45	0.57	0.74
Somaliland	0.44	0.3	0.58	0.32	0.52	0.6
Singapore	0.43	0.36	0.77	0.79	0.14	0.75
Thailand	0.42	0.31	0.67	0.49	0.33	0.35
Hungary	0.42	0.32	0.67	0.62	0.54	0.3
Lebanon	0.42	0.27	0.54	0.5	0.42	0.76
Georgia	0.4	0.28	0.59	0.69	0.48	0.72
Tunisia	0.4	0.26	0.57	0.73	0.51	0.75
Ivory Coast	0.39	0.23	0.47	0.49	0.57	0.5
Philippines	0.39	0.29	0.64	0.31	0.56	0.54
Ukraine	0.39	0.24	0.52	0.68	0.55	0.75
India	0.38	0.26	0.57	0.41	0.54	0.57
Iraq	0.37	0.22	0.48	0.41	0.49	0.62
Tanzania	0.36	0.3	0.7	0.76	0.56	0.68
Madagascar	0.36	0.19	0.39	0.34	0.47	0.36
Togo	0.35	0.16	0.32	0.56	0.54	0.71
Angola	0.34	0.16	0.34	0.24	0.16	0.37
Mauritania	0.33	0.13	0.25	0.29	0.53	0.56
El Salvador	0.32	0.09	0.14	0.25	0.35	0.25
Kyrgyzstan	0.31	0.18	0.42	0.59	0.37	0.32
Zanzibar	0.31	0.25	0.65	0.62	0.4	0.56
Democratic Republic of the Congo	0.31	0.12	0.23	0.36	0.49	0.54
Gabon	0.3	0.18	0.43	0.64	0.62	0.58
Pakistan	0.3	0.18	0.42	0.26	0.47	0.43
Serbia	0.3	0.21	0.52	0.73	0.55	0.52
Comoros	0.29	0.13	0.3	0.58	0.51	0.28
Central African Republic	0.29	0.1	0.21	0.24	0.29	0.29
Turkey	0.29	0.11	0.23	0.54	0.4	0.13
Jordan	0.28	0.27	0.76	0.56	0.31	0.74
Mozambique	0.28	0.18	0.45	0.49	0.53	0.44
Zimbabwe	0.27	0.15	0.37	0.33	0.55	0.6
Algeria	0.26	0.13	0.3	0.57	0.2	0.48
Cameroon	0.26	0.11	0.27	0.48	0.2	0.22
Kazakhstan	0.26	0.13	0.33	0.56	0.25	0.5
Morocco	0.26	0.25	0.72	0.56	0.39	0.81
Ethiopia	0.26	0.1	0.23	0.43	0.32	0.52
Uganda	0.25	0.16	0.44	0.36	0.41	0.65
Guinea-Bissau	0.25	0.1	0.22	0.47	0.33	0.32
Djibouti	0.25	0.12	0.29	0.54	0.37	0.38
Republic of the Congo	0.24	0.12	0.29	0.26	0.53	0.45
Chad	0.24	0.06	0.11	0.18	0.34	0.32
Haiti	0.24	0.1	0.24	0.17	0.31	0.56
Niger	0.23	0.18	0.51	0.64	0.56	0.77
Uzbekistan	0.22	0.08	0.19	0.44	0.2	0.45
Palestine (West Bank)	0.21	0.11	0.31	0.56	0.44	0.17
Bangladesh	0.2	0.12	0.34	0.33	0.28	0.48
Libya	0.19	0.1	0.28	0.36	0.24	0.84
Rwanda	0.19	0.09	0.25	0.51	0.39	0.57
Guinea	0.19	0.1	0.27	0.46	0.36	0.27
Egypt	0.19	0.12	0.34	0.31	0.21	0.36
Burundi	0.18	0.06	0.15	0.28	0.44	0.17
Cambodia	0.18	0.05	0.12	0.24	0.15	0.22
Venezuela	0.18	0.04	0.09	0.22	0.46	0.02
Cuba	0.18	0.06	0.15	0.74	0.13	0.29
Oman	0.18	0.14	0.44	0.56	0.37	0.21
Equatorial Guinea	0.17	0.05	0.11	0.33	0.09	0.11
Azerbaijan	0.17	0.05	0.13	0.39	0.1	0.07
Russia	0.17	0.06	0.15	0.41	0.39	0.16
Somalia	0.16	0.13	0.41	0.3	0.29	0.63
Mali	0.16	0.15	0.49	0.56	0.54	0.7
Belarus	0.16	0.04	0.09	0.77	0.14	0.06
Iran	0.16	0.1	0.32	0.5	0.1	0.28
Tajikistan	0.16	0.04	0.11	0.17	0.16	0.12
Nicaragua	0.15	0.02	0.02	0.26	0.31	0.02
Hong Kong	0.15	0.14	0.47	0.75	0.13	0.16
Turkmenistan	0.15	0.03	0.08	0.27	0.08	0.06
Vietnam	0.15	0.1	0.33	0.55	0.56	0.62
Bahrain	0.14	0.06	0.19	0.43	0.16	0.18
Kuwait	0.14	0.13	0.43	0.59	0.15	0.6
Laos	0.14	0.11	0.36	0.38	0.4	0.18
Burkina Faso	0.13	0.1	0.34	0.54	0.34	0.14
South Sudan	0.13	0.06	0.2	0.08	0.14	0.1
Sudan	0.13	0.03	0.09	0.25	0.15	0.04
Eswatini	0.13	0.1	0.32	0.25	0.37	0.2
Palestine (Gaza)	0.13	0.06	0.18	0.4	0.22	0.13
Syria	0.13	0.05	0.17	0.43	0.18	0.59
Yemen	0.13	0.04	0.12	0.09	0.23	0.11
United Arab Emirates	0.1	0.08	0.26	0.44	0.09	0.29
North Korea	0.08	0.01	0.03	0.34	0.15	0.02
Myanmar	0.08	0.02	0.04	0.2	0.14	0.12
China	0.07	0.04	0.14	0.29	0.12	0.23
Afghanistan	0.07	0.02	0.06	0.05	0.18	0.03
Eritrea	0.07	0.01	0.02	0.41	0.02	0.08
Qatar	0.03	0.09	0.35	0.39	0.13	0.47
Saudi Arabia	0.02	0.05	0.18	0.45	0.1	0.28

== Regimes of the World ==
Regimes of the World (2026): Liberal Democracy Electoral Democracy / Democratic Grey Zone Autocratic Grey Zone / Electoral Autocracy Closed Autocracy

V-Dem maintains the Regimes of the World index, which classifies governments using data from its other indices as either a closed autocracy, electoral autocracy, electoral democracy, or liberal democracy. It is heavily inspired by Robert Dahl's theory of polyarchy based on six institutional guarantees: elected officials, free and fair elections, freedom of expression, alternative sources of information, associational autonomy, and inclusive citizenship.

=== Autocracies ===
Countries autocratizing (red) or democratizing (blue) substantially and significantly (2010–2020). Countries in grey are substantially unchanged.

Regimes where leaders are not de facto accountable to citizens and may lack multiparty or free and fair elections. Dahl's institutional prerequisites are not fulfilled.

Closed Autocracy

Governments which lack multiparty elections for the chief executive or the legislature, or lack any competition such as in one-party states. Legislative institutions are de facto undermined and electoral accountability is evaded.

Electoral Autocracy

Governments where the chief executive, legislature, or both are accountable in de jure multiparty elections. They fall short of democratic standards due to irregularities, limitations on party competition, and violations of Dahl's prerequisites. They are closely related to theories of electoral authoritarianism and competitive authoritarianism.

=== Democracies ===
Regimes with de facto multiparty, free and fair elections. Dahl's institutional prerequisites are at least minimally fulfilled.

Electoral Democracy

Regimes that possess the bare minimum to be considered a democracy. They are "de-facto accountable to citizens through periodic elections", but are not liberal democracies and lack further entrenched individual and minority rights beyond the electoral sphere. Basic electoral democracies may not possess a fully developed rule of law, legislative and judicial oversight of the executive branch, protections against the "tyranny of the majority", and only minimal fulfillment of Robert Dahl's institutional prerequisites for democracy.

Liberal Democracy

Regimes that possess the rule of law and satisfy liberal principles. They provide checks and balances between legislative and judicial oversight of the executive branch, limitations on government to prevent the "tyranny of the majority", protect individual liberties, and provide equal access to and protection under the law. A fully developed rule of law is essential for liberal democracies, as it ensures decisions are implemented. It is sometimes referred to as a "Madisonian" democracy.

== Digital Society Project ==
The Digital Society Project is a subset of indicators on V-Dem's survey that asks questions about social media's political status and the internet. Specifically, the Digital Society Project measures a range of questions related to internet censorship, misinformation online, and internet shutdowns. This annual report includes 35 indicators assessing five areas: disinformation, digital media freedom, state regulation of digital media, the polarization of online media, and online social cleavages. It has been updated each year starting in 2019, with data covering from 2000–2021. Similar to other expert analyses like Freedom House, these data are more prone to false positives when compared with remotely sensed data, such as that from Access Now or the OpenNet Initiative.

== Criticisms ==
Data on democracy, and particularly global indices of democracy, and the data they rely on, have been the subject of scrutiny and criticized by various scholars. Gerardo L. Munck and Jay Verkuilen for instance, have raised concerns about the methods used by prominent democracy indices / rankings such as Freedom House and Polity, such as the concept of democracy they measured, the design of indicators, and the aggregation rule. Political scientists Andrew T. Little and Anne Meng "highlight measurement concerns regarding time-varying bias in expert-coded data" such as Freedom House and V-Dem and encourage improving expert-coding practices. Knutsen et al. did not see evidence for time-varying bias in their expert-coded data and note the application of item response theory, factor analysis and estimates of uncertainties to limit expert biases while discussing concerns in operationalization of observer-invariant measures of democracy.

=== Scholarly criticism ===
In 2022, political scientist Jonas Wolff criticised V-Dem for moving away from its pluralist conceptualisation of democracy towards an emphasis on liberal democracy. Political scientists Andrew Little and Anne Meng have questioned whether declines identified by expert-coded indices such as V-Dem could partly reflect systematic bias among expert coders rather than changes in democratic institutions. V-Dem researchers disputed this interpretation, finding no evidence of systematic "bad-vibes" bias in their expert assessments. Salvatore Babones has argued that "thick" democracy indices such as V-Dem may disadvantage countries in the Global South because of their conceptualisation and measurement of democracy.

=== External criticism ===
In 2022, the Indian Economic Advisory Council to the Prime Minister (EAC-PM) published a working paper by Sanjeev Sanyal and Akanksha Arora criticising V-Dem and other perception-based democracy indices. The authors argued that the indices relied on the opinions of a small number of experts, used subjective questions that were difficult to answer objectively or compare across countries, omitted some potentially relevant questions, and included measures that were not appropriate for assessing democracy across all countries. The paper also disputed V-Dem's assessment of India, arguing that it placed the country at a level comparable to the period of the Emergency and below Northern Cyprus.

In 2025, the Peace Research Institute Oslo characterized the demotion of Israel from its previous "liberal democracy" status as "cosmetic", asserting that "Israel is not a democracy". They criticized V-Dem for treating the Israeli-occupied Palestinian territories as separate when assessing Israel's democratic status, noting that this ignores the 5.5 million Palestinians who live under de facto Israeli sovereign control and apartheid but are not afforded the same rights as Israeli citizens and cannot vote in Israeli elections. By contrast, the more than 700,000 Israeli settlers living illegally in the West Bank have full voting rights and legal protections under Israeli law, despite living outside the internationally recognised borders of Israel; "Either the occupation must end, so that Israel no longer has control over Palestinians' lives, or Israel must offer everyone living under its control citizenship and the right to vote. [...] Democracy is not measured by the rights of a country's privileged population. It is measured according to the rights of its population as a whole."

== See also ==
- Academic Freedom Index
