= Democracy-Dictatorship Index =

Binary measure of democracy and dictatorship

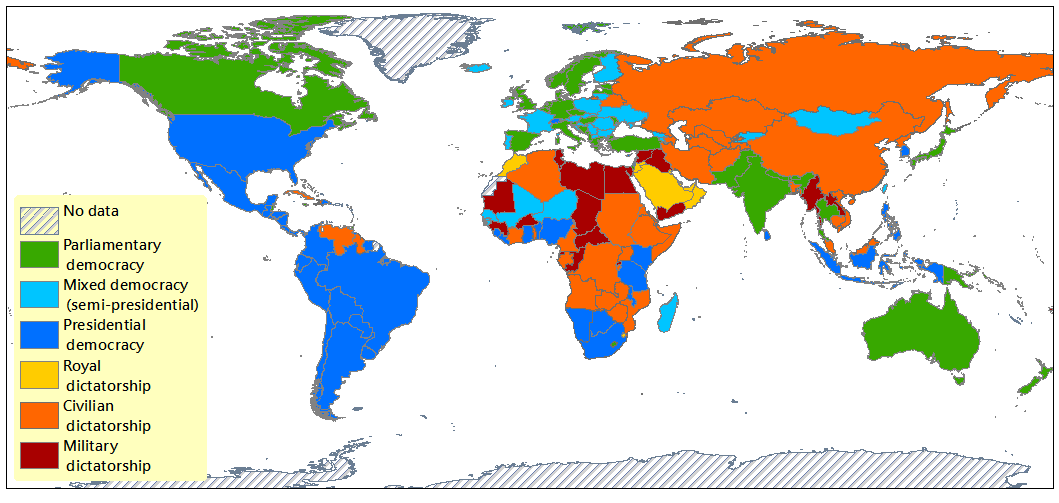
Democracies and dictatorships in 2008

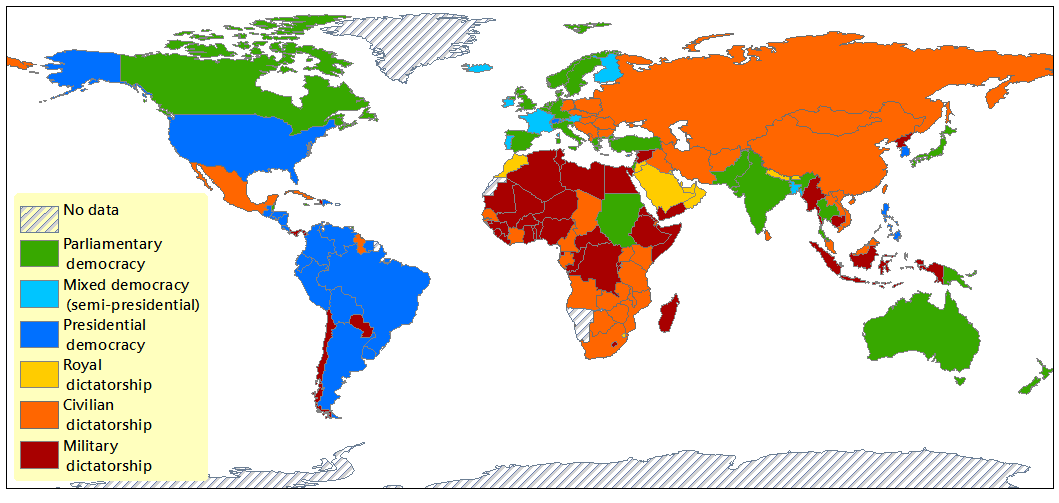
Democracies and dictatorships in 1988

Democracy-Dictatorship (DD), index of democracy and dictatorship, or simply the DD index, or the DD datasets, was the binary measure of democracy and dictatorship whose publication stopped in 2008. Originally proposed by Adam Przeworski, and further developed and maintained by José Antonio Cheibub, Jennifer Gandhi, and James Raymond Vreeland.

Based on the regime binary classification idea proposed by Mike Alvarez in 1996, and the Democracy and Development (or DD measure, ACLP dataset) proposed by Przeworski, Cheibub, Gandhi, and Vreeland developed a six-fold regime classification scheme, resulting what the authors called as the DD datasets. The DD dataset covers the annual data points of 199 countries from 1946 (or date of independence) to 2008.

== Six-fold regime classification scheme and its rules ==
The DD index first classifies the regimes into two types: democracies and dictatorships. For democracies, it categorizes them into three types: parliamentary, semi-presidential and presidential democracies. For dictatorships, monarchic, military and civilian dictatorship. " Based on a "minimalist" theory of democracy, the index relies on rules regarding the existence of competitive elections. Resorting to democratic concepts by Karl Popper and Joseph Schumpeter, Przeworski defended the minimalist approach, citing Popper that "the only system in which citizens can get rid of governments without bloodshed."

=== Four rules ===
For a regime to be considered as a democracy by the DD scheme, it must meet the requirement of four rules below:

1. The chief executive must be chosen by popular election or by a body that was itself popularly elected.
2. The legislature must be popularly elected.
3. There must be more than one party competing in the elections.
4. An alternation in power under electoral rules identical to the ones that brought the incumbent to office must have taken place.

Some regimes may meet the first three rules, but lack an alternation in power in its historical past; these regimes are classified as dictatorships because of cases where the incumbent only allows elections as long as they keep winning, and would refuse to step down if they lost. However, since they might also give up power willingly, the regime is marked with a type II value to signal potential classification errors where a democratic regime may be falsely classified as dictatorship.. This does not indicate cases of semi-democracy or semi-dictatorship.. The authors acknowledged that the last rule is more complicated to implement, but stated that it helps researchers to control potential errors and removes subjective judgement from the classification.

== Countries ==
Note: the most recent dataset was released in 2008.

The Democracy-Dictatorship Index has the main regime types of "democracy" and "dictatorship" and three sub-types for each as well. Democracies can be either parliamentary, semi-presidential, or presidential and dictatorships can be civilian, military, or royal. Many countries which are seen as otherwise democratic are dictatorships because there has yet to be an alternation in power since their incumbent government has never lost an election. Therefore, it is impossible to know if the regime is a democracy or a dictatorship, so DD Index considers them dictatorships until an alternation in power occurs.

Countries by regime type (2008)
Regime	Type	Subtype	Reason for Dictatorship
Afghanistan	Dictatorship	Civilian Dictatorship	4. No alternation in power
Albania	Democracy	Parliamentary Democracy	
Algeria	Dictatorship	Civilian Dictatorship	4. No alternation in power
Andorra	Democracy	Parliamentary Democracy	
Angola	Dictatorship	Civilian Dictatorship	1. Executive not elected
Antigua and Barbuda	Democracy	Parliamentary Democracy	
Argentina	Democracy	Presidential Democracy	
Armenia	Democracy	Semi-Presidential Democracy	
Australia	Democracy	Parliamentary Democracy	
Austria	Democracy	Semi-Presidential Democracy	
Azerbaijan	Dictatorship	Civilian Dictatorship	4. No alternation in power
Bahamas	Democracy	Parliamentary Democracy	
Bahrain	Dictatorship	Royal Dictatorship	1. Executive not elected 2. No parties
Bangladesh	Dictatorship	Civilian Dictatorship	1. Executive not elected 2. No Legislature; 3. No legislative parties
Barbados	Democracy	Parliamentary Democracy	
Belarus	Dictatorship	Civilian Dictatorship	4. No alternation in power
Belgium	Democracy	Parliamentary Democracy	
Belize	Democracy	Parliamentary Democracy	
Benin	Democracy	Presidential Democracy	
Bhutan	Democracy	Parliamentary Democracy	
Bolivia	Democracy	Presidential Democracy	
Bosnia and Herzegovina	Dictatorship	Civilian Dictatorship	1. Executive not elected
Botswana	Dictatorship	Military Dictatorship	4. No alternation in power
Brazil	Democracy	Presidential Democracy	
Brunei	Dictatorship	Royal Dictatorship	1. Executive not elected 2. Legislature not elected 3. One party
Bulgaria	Democracy	Semi-Presidential Democracy	
Burkina Faso	Dictatorship	Military Dictatorship	4. No alternation in power
Burundi	Democracy	Presidential Democracy	
Cambodia	Dictatorship	Royal Dictatorship	1. Executive not elected 3. No legislative parties
Cameroon	Dictatorship	Civilian Dictatorship	4. No alternation in power
Canada	Democracy	Parliamentary Democracy	
Cape Verde	Democracy	Semi-Presidential Democracy	
Central African Republic	Dictatorship	Military Dictatorship	4. No alternation in power
Chad	Dictatorship	Military Dictatorship	4. No alternation in power
Chile	Democracy	Presidential Democracy	
China	Dictatorship	Civilian Dictatorship	3. All parties are in regime
Colombia	Democracy	Presidential Democracy	
Comoros	Democracy	Presidential Democracy	
Congo	Dictatorship	Military Dictatorship	4. No alternation in power
Costa Rica	Democracy	Presidential Democracy	
Ivory Coast	Dictatorship	Civilian Dictatorship	
Croatia	Democracy	Semi-Presidential Democracy	
Cuba	Dictatorship	Military Dictatorship	4. No alternation in power
Cyprus	Democracy	Presidential Democracy	
Czech Republic	Democracy	Parliamentary Democracy	
DR Congo	Dictatorship	Civilian Dictatorship	4. No alternation in power
Denmark	Democracy	Parliamentary Democracy	
Djibouti	Dictatorship	Civilian Dictatorship	3. One legislative party
Dominica	Democracy	Parliamentary Democracy	
Dominican Republic	Democracy	Presidential Democracy	
Timor-Leste	Democracy	Semi-Presidential Democracy	
Ecuador	Democracy	Presidential Democracy	
Egypt	Dictatorship	Military Dictatorship	4. No alternation in power
El Salvador	Democracy	Presidential Democracy	
Equatorial Guinea	Dictatorship	Military Dictatorship	4. No alternation in power
Eritrea	Dictatorship	Civilian Dictatorship	1. Executive not elected 2. Legislature not elected 3. All parties banned 4. No alternation in power
Estonia	Democracy	Parliamentary Democracy	
Ethiopia	Dictatorship	Civilian Dictatorship	3. All parties are in regime 4. No alternation in power
Fiji	Dictatorship	Military Dictatorship	1. Executive not elected 2. No Legislature; 3. No Legislative parties
Finland	Democracy	Semi-Presidential Democracy	
France	Democracy	Semi-Presidential Democracy	
Gabon	Dictatorship	Civilian Dictatorship	4. No alternation in power
Gambia	Dictatorship	Military Dictatorship	4. No alternation in power
Georgia	Democracy	Semi-Presidential Democracy	
Germany	Democracy	Parliamentary Democracy	
Ghana	Democracy	Presidential Democracy	
Greece	Democracy	Parliamentary Democracy	
Grenada	Democracy	Parliamentary Democracy	
Guatemala	Democracy	Presidential Democracy	
Guinea	Dictatorship	Military Dictatorship	1. Executive not elected
Guinea-Bissau	Democracy	Semi-Presidential Democracy	
Guyana	Dictatorship	Civilian Dictatorship	4. No alternation in power
Haiti	Dictatorship	Civilian Dictatorship	4. No alternation in power
Honduras	Democracy	Presidential Democracy	
Hungary	Democracy	Parliamentary Democracy	
Iceland	Democracy	Semi-Presidential Democracy	
India	Democracy	Parliamentary Democracy	
Indonesia	Democracy	Presidential Democracy	
Iran	Dictatorship	Civilian Dictatorship	
Iraq	Dictatorship	Military Dictatorship	All parties in regime
Ireland	Democracy	Semi-Presidential Democracy	
Israel	Democracy	Parliamentary Democracy	
Italy	Democracy	Parliamentary Democracy	
Jamaica	Democracy	Parliamentary Democracy	
Japan	Democracy	Parliamentary Democracy	
Jordan	Dictatorship	Royal Dictatorship	1. Executive not elected
Kazakhstan	Dictatorship	Civilian Dictatorship	4. No alternation in power
Kenya	Democracy	Presidential Democracy	
Kiribati	Democracy	Parliamentary Democracy	
Kuwait	Dictatorship	Royal Dictatorship	1. Executive not elected 3. All parties legally banned
Kyrgyzstan	Democracy	Semi-Presidential Democracy	
Laos	Dictatorship	Military Dictatorship	3. Legally single party state
Latvia	Democracy	Parliamentary Democracy	
Lebanon	Democracy	Parliamentary Democracy	
Lesotho	Dictatorship	Civilian Dictatorship	4. No alternation in power
Liberia	Democracy	Presidential Democracy	
Libya	Dictatorship	Military Dictatorship	1. Executive not elected 2. Legislature is appointed 3. No parties
Liechtenstein	Democracy	Parliamentary Democracy	
Lithuania	Democracy	Semi-Presidential Democracy	
Luxembourg	Democracy	Parliamentary Democracy	
Macedonia	Democracy	Semi-Presidential Democracy	
Madagascar	Democracy	Semi-Presidential Democracy	
Malawi	Democracy	Presidential Democracy	
Malaysia	Democracy	Parliamentary Democracy	3. All parties in regime 4. No alternation in power
Maldives	Democracy	Presidential Democracy	
Mali	Democracy	Semi-Presidential Democracy	
Malta	Democracy	Parliamentary Democracy	
Marshall Islands	Democracy	Parliamentary Democracy	
Mauritania	Dictatorship	Military Dictatorship	1. Executive not elected 2. No Legislature; 3. No Legislative parties
Mauritius	Democracy	Parliamentary Democracy	
Mexico	Democracy	Presidential Democracy	
Federated States of Micronesia	Democracy	Presidential Democracy	
Moldova	Democracy	Parliamentary Democracy	
Mongolia	Democracy	Semi-Presidential Democracy	
Montenegro	Dictatorship	Civilian Dictatorship	4. No alternation in power
Morocco	Dictatorship	Royal Dictatorship	1. Executive not elected
Mozambique	Dictatorship	Civilian Dictatorship	4. No alternation in power
Myanmar	Dictatorship	Military Dictatorship	1. Executive not elected 2. No Legislature; 3. No Legislative parties
Namibia	Dictatorship	Civilian Dictatorship	4. No alternation in power
Nauru	Democracy	Parliamentary Democracy	
Nepal	Democracy	Parliamentary Democracy	
Netherlands	Democracy	Parliamentary Democracy	
New Zealand	Democracy	Parliamentary Democracy	
Nicaragua	Dictatorship	Civilian Dictatorship	
Niger	Democracy	Semi-Presidential Democracy	
Nigeria	Democracy	Presidential Democracy	
North Korea	Dictatorship	Civilian Dictatorship	1. Executive not elected
Norway	Democracy	Parliamentary Democracy	
Oman	Dictatorship	Royal Dictatorship	1. Executive not elected 2. Legislature is closed 3. No Legislative parties
Pakistan	Democracy	Parliamentary Democracy	
Palau	Democracy	Presidential Democracy	
Panama	Democracy	Presidential Democracy	
Papua New Guinea	Democracy	Parliamentary Democracy	
Paraguay	Democracy	Presidential Democracy	
Peru	Democracy	Presidential Democracy	
Philippines	Democracy	Presidential Democracy	
Poland	Democracy	Semi-Presidential Democracy	
Portugal	Democracy	Semi-Presidential Democracy	
Qatar	Dictatorship	Royal Dictatorship	1. Executive not elected 2. Legislature not elected 3. No Legislative parties
Romania	Democracy	Semi-Presidential Democracy	
Russia	Dictatorship	Civilian Dictatorship	4. No alternation in power
Rwanda	Dictatorship	Military Dictatorship	4. No alternation in power
Samoa	Dictatorship	Royal Dictatorship	4. No alternation in power
San Marino	Democracy	Parliamentary Democracy	
São Tomé and Príncipe	Democracy	Semi-Presidential Democracy	
Saudi Arabia	Dictatorship	Royal Dictatorship	1. Executive not elected 2. Legislature not elected 3. No Legislative parties
Senegal	Democracy	Semi-Presidential Democracy	
Serbia	Democracy	Semi-Presidential Democracy	
Seychelles	Dictatorship	Civilian Dictatorship	4. No alternation in power
Sierra Leone	Democracy	Presidential Democracy	
Singapore	Dictatorship	Civilian Dictatorship	4. No alternation in power
Slovakia	Democracy	Semi-Presidential Democracy	
Slovenia	Democracy	Parliamentary Democracy	
Solomon Islands	Democracy	Parliamentary Democracy	
Somalia	Dictatorship	Civilian Dictatorship	2. Legislature not elected 3. No Legislative parties
South Africa	Dictatorship	Civilian Dictatorship	4. No alternation in power
South Korea	Democracy	Presidential Democracy	
Spain	Democracy	Parliamentary Democracy	
Sri Lanka	Democracy	Presidential Democracy	
Saint Kitts and Nevis	Democracy	Parliamentary Democracy	
Saint Lucia	Democracy	Parliamentary Democracy	
Saint Vincent and the Grenadines	Democracy	Parliamentary Democracy	
Sudan	Dictatorship	Military Dictatorship	1. Executive not elected 2. Legislature not elected
Suriname	Democracy	Presidential Democracy	
Swaziland	Dictatorship	Royal Dictatorship	1. Executive not elected 3. Legally single party state
Sweden	Democracy	Parliamentary Democracy	
Switzerland	Democracy	Direct Democracy	
Syria	Dictatorship	Military Dictatorship	3. All parties in regime
Taiwan	Democracy	Semi-Presidential Democracy	
Tajikistan	Dictatorship	Civilian Dictatorship	4. No alternation in power
Tanzania	Dictatorship	Military Dictatorship	4. No alternation in power
Thailand	Democracy	Parliamentary Democracy	
Togo	Dictatorship	Civilian Dictatorship	4. No alternation in power
Tonga	Dictatorship	Royal Dictatorship	1. Executive not elected 2. Legislature not elected 3. All parties legally banned 4. No alternation in power
Trinidad and Tobago	Democracy	Parliamentary Democracy	
Tunisia	Dictatorship	Military Dictatorship	4. No alternation in power
Turkey	Democracy	Parliamentary Democracy	
Turkmenistan	Dictatorship	Civilian Dictatorship	3. Legally one party state
Tuvalu	Democracy	Parliamentary Democracy	
Uganda	Dictatorship	Civilian Dictatorship	4. No alternation in power
Ukraine	Democracy	Semi-Presidential Democracy	
United Arab Emirates	Dictatorship	Royal Dictatorship	1. Executive not elected 2. No Legislature; 3. No Legislative parties
United Kingdom	Democracy	Parliamentary Democracy	
United States	Democracy	Presidential Democracy	
Uruguay	Democracy	Presidential Democracy	
Uzbekistan	Dictatorship	Civilian Dictatorship	3. One party 4. No alternation in power
Vanuatu	Democracy	Parliamentary Democracy	
Venezuela	Dictatorship	Civilian Dictatorship	1. Executive not elected 4. No alternation in power
Vietnam	Dictatorship	Civilian Dictatorship	1. Executive not elected 3. One party
Yemen	Dictatorship	Military Dictatorship	4. No alternation in power
Zambia	Dictatorship	Civilian Dictatorship	4. No alternation in power
Zimbabwe	Dictatorship	Civilian Dictatorship	4. No alternation in power

== Democracy classification ==
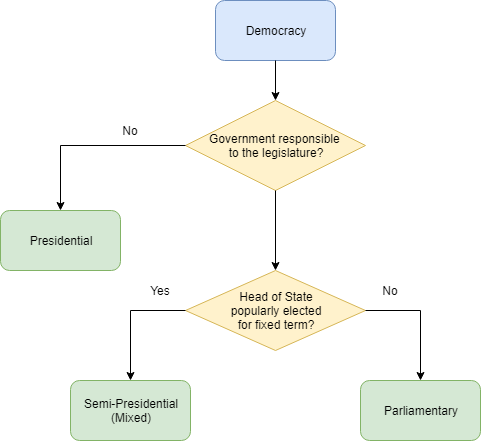
A flowchart for the classification of democracies. Note that the official names do not determine their classification.

Democracies are classified by the rules in which executives can be appointed or removed and can be either presidential, mixed or semi-presidential, or parliamentary. These names do not have to correspond to the official or colloquial titles of any of the countries offices. For example, DD could classify a country which has a legislative assembly whose official name is "the parliament" but still classify it in any of the three categories. The classification depends on the rules outlining the relationship between a country's government, legislative assembly (often called the legislature), and head of state. The government composes the chief executive and the heads of the executive departments. The chief executive can take many titles including chancellor, prime minister, or premier and the heads of the executive departments can bear different titles and be called different things. In the United Kingdom, for example, the chief executive is the prime minister, and the ministers are the heads of the executive departments, which together compose the government.

=== Legislative responsibility ===
The first distinction made is whether a country has a government has legislative responsibility, i.e. whether a majority vote in the legislature can remove the sitting government without cause. The required majority needed to remove the sitting government varies between countries but is termed a vote of no confidence. Some countries (such as Spain, Belgium, Germany, and Israel) require that the vote of no confidence also specify who is going to replace the sitting government to minimize the time without an interim government, essentially replacing one government with another. This type of vote is termed a constructive vote of no confidence. Sometimes sitting governments will attach a vote of no confidence clause to a piece of legislation they want passed, effectively tying the survival of the government on the piece of legislation.

=== Head of state ===
The second distinction made is whether the head of state is popularly elected for a fixed term. The head of state may be unelected and still be classified as a democracy. Popularly elected means that the head of state is directly elected by the citizens or elected by an assembly which then elects them (an example being the electoral college in the United States). In Germany, the head of state is elected by regional legislatures and not popularly elected. Elected heads of state are usually referred to as "president." The phrase "fixed term" indicates the once the head of state is chosen, they serve a known and a limited number of years before another election is held, and they cannot be removed from the office in the meantime via a vote of no confidence.

The head of state in most parliamentary democracies formally appoint the head of government. Some countries, such as Greece and Bulgaria, stipulate who the head of state chooses as head of government. In the former, for example, the President must appoint as Prime Minister the leader of the largest party in parliament, who has three days to gain the confidence of a majority thereof. Some countries, such as Sweden, instead charge another person entirely with choosing the head of government, such as the presiding officer of the legislative assembly.

=== Classification ===
The first distinction made is whether a democracy's government is responsible to the legislature. If it is not responsible, it is a presidential democracy. If it is, then a further distinction is made between democracies where the head of state is popularly elected and those where the head of state is not popularly elected. If the head of state is popularly elected for a fixed term then, the democracy is mixed or semi-presidential. If the head of state serves for life or is not popularly elected or a fixed term, then the democracy is parliamentary.

=== Definitions ===
A presidential democracy has a government that does not need the majority support of a legislature to stay in power. A semi-presidential (mixed) democracy has a government that needs the majority of support from a legislature to exist and whose head of state is popularly elected for a fixed term. Parliamentary democracy is the same as semi-presidential but has heads of state which are not popularly elected for a fixed term, typically either monarchs or officials not chosen by popular elections.

== Comparison with other democracy-measuring data sets ==
The DD dataset is limited to 199 countries after 1946, whereas Boix, Miller, & Rosato, 2013 proposed a data set from 1800 to 2007, covering 219 countries. The 2010 version of Polity data series covers 189 countries from 1800 to 2009. Gugiu & Centellas developed the Democracy Cluster Classification Index that integrates five democracy indicators (including the DD dataset, Polity dataset), clustering 24 American and 39 European regimes over 30 years.

== See also ==
- Polity data series
