= Political Instability Task Force =

U.S. government-sponsored research project

The Political Instability Task Force (PITF), formerly known as State Failure Task Force, is a U.S. government-sponsored research project to build a database on major domestic political conflicts leading to state failures. The study analyzed factors to denote the effectiveness of public institutions, population well-being, and found that partial democracies with low involvement in international trade and with high infant mortality are most prone to revolutions.

== Project history ==
The project began as an unclassified study that was commissioned to a group of academics (particularly active was the Center for Global Policy at George Mason University) by the Central Intelligence Agency's Directorate of Intelligence in response to a request from senior U.S. policy makers. The State Failure Problem Set dataset and spreadsheets were originally prepared in 1994 by researchers at the Center for International Development and Conflict Management (CIDCM) at the University of Maryland under the direction of Ted Robert Gurr and subject to the review of the State Failure Task Force. The Problem Set was subsequently reviewed, revised, and updated on an annual basis through 1999 under the direction of Ted Gurr and, beginning in 1999, Monty G. Marshall at CIDCM. In January 2001, a major review and revision of the Problem Set coding guidelines and dataset, under the direction of Monty G. Marshall, was concluded that substantially altered the case identifications and case parameters recorded in the Problem Set.

== Methodology ==
The PITF first identified over 100 "problem cases" in the world from 1955 to 2011. Four distinct types of state failure events are included in the dataset: revolutionary wars, ethnic wars, adverse regime changes, and genocides and politicides. The Problem Set data includes the following information on each case: country, month and year of onset, month and year of ending (unless ongoing as of December 31 of the current update year), type of case, and annual codes on magnitude variables. The basic structure of the data is the "case-year," that is, there is a separate case-entry for each additional year of a multi-year episode. Only the first annual record for each event contains a brief narrative description of the event.

The goal was to find factors associated with major political conflicts. Over 400 cases were analyzed, both for global and regional data sets.

The common variables listed in each data version are as follows:

- COUNTRY - Full alpha country name
- SCODE - 3-letter alpha country code
- CCODE - 3-number numeric Singer country code
- YEAR - 4-number numeric year
- MOBEGIN - 2-number numeric month denoting event beginning
- YRBEGIN - 4-number numeric year denoting event beginning
- MOEND - 2-number numeric month denoting event ending (99=ongoing)
- YREND - 4-number numeric year denoting event ending (9999=ongoing)
- PTYPE - 1-number numeric event type (1=ETH; 2=REV; 3=REG; 4=GEN)
- DESC - Brief alpha text description identifying specific event (only included with first case-year in multi-year episodes)

=== Revolutionary and ethnic wars ===
Revolutionary wars are episodes of violent conflict between governments and politically organized groups (political challengers) that seek to overthrow the central government, to replace its leaders, or to seize power in one region. Conflicts must include substantial use of violence by one or both parties to qualify as "wars."

Ethnic wars are episodes of violent conflict between governments and national, ethnic, religious, or other communal minorities (ethnic challengers) in which the challengers seek major changes in their status. Most ethnic wars since 1955 have been guerrilla or civil wars in which the challengers have sought independence or regional autonomy. A few, like the events in South Africa's black townships in 1976–77, involve large-scale demonstrations and riots aimed at sweeping political reform that were violently suppressed by police and military. Rioting and warfare between rival communal groups is not coded as ethnic warfare unless it involves conflict over political power or government policy.

Additional variables specific to the Ethnic and Revolutionary War episodes are as follows:

- MAGFIGHT - Scaled number of rebel combatants or activists (range 0–4; 9=missing)
- MAGFATAL - Scaled annual number of fatalities related to fighting (range 0–4; 9=missing)
- MAGAREA - Scaled portion of country affected by fighting (range 0–4; 9=missing)
- AVEMAG - Average of the three magnitude scores (range 0–4.0; 9=missing)

=== Adverse regime changes ===
Adverse regime changes are defined by the State Failure Task Force as major, adverse shifts in patterns of governance, including

- major and abrupt shifts away from more open, electoral systems to more closed, authoritarian systems;
- revolutionary changes in political elites and the mode of governance;
- contested dissolution of federated states or secession of a substantial area of a state by extrajudicial means; and
- complete or near-total collapse of central state authority and the ability to govern.

Abrupt transitions from more authoritarian rule to more open, institutionalized governance systems, defined by the State Failure Task Force as "democratic transitions," are not considered state failures in this sense and, thus, are not included.

Additional variables specific to the Adverse Regime Change episodes are as follows:

- MAGFAIL - Scaled failure of state authority (range 1–4; 9=missing)
- MAGCOL - Scaled collapse of democratic institutions (range 1–4; 9=missing)
- MAGVIOL - Scaled violence associated with regime transition (range 1–4; 9=missing)
- MAGAVE - Average of the three magnitude scores (range 1–4.0; 9=missing)
- POLITYX - Type of regime change

=== Genocides and politicides ===
Genocide and politicide events involve the promotion, execution, and/or implied consent of sustained policies by governing elites or their agents or in the case of civil war, either of the contending authorities that result in the deaths of a substantial portion of a communal group or politicized non communal group. In genocides the victimized groups are defined primarily in terms of their communal (ethnolinguistic, religious) characteristics. In politicides, by contrast, groups are defined primarily in terms of their political opposition to the regime and dominant groups.

Genocide and politicide are distinguished from state repression and terror. In cases of state terror authorities arrest, persecute or execute a few members of a group in ways designed to terrorize the majority of the group into passivity or acquiescence. In the case of genocide and politicide authorities physically exterminate enough (not necessarily all) members of a target group so that it can no longer pose any conceivable threat to their rule or interests.

Additional variables specific to the Genocide/Politicide episodes are as follows:

- DEATHMAG - Scaled annual number of deaths (range 0–5.0)

== Findings ==
Fairly consistent findings were produced, suggesting that there are three statistically significant variables most often associated with political upheavals:

- regime type: a U-shaped relationship was found between regime type and political unrest: partial democracies were at high risk, whereas both democracies and autocracies were relatively stable.
- international trade: Having a high portion of gross national product (GNP) tied to international trade was positively related to stability. The explanation given was that in partial democracies are states in which there are more instances of conflict, reform, and concessions; often seen as weakness (see: political opportunity theory, States and Social Revolutions, waves of democracy and waves of revolutions). Being heavily involved in international trade requires respect for the rule of law and low levels of corruption. Countries that do not participate heavily in international trade likely see groups distorting trade and other economic activity for their benefit, making internal conflicts more likely.
- infant mortality. Lower infant mortality, were generally more stable was also positively associated with stability. This is explained as the infant mortality measures for standard of living; therefore countries with low infant mortality rate have more efficient welfare and justice systems.

Thus partial democracies with low involvement in international trade and with high infant mortality are most prone to revolutions.

Quantitative models developed during the study would have accurately predicted over 85% of major state crises events occurring in 1990–1997. However while the models can predict state crises, they cannot predict their magnitude and eventual outcome.

There are four versions of the Political Instability (State Failure) Problem Set data; each are downloadable from the PITF Problem Set page in Microsoft Excel format. This format was chosen because it is readily importable to most spreadsheet and statistical software applications. The four versions are as follows:

- PITF Ethnic Wars 2004.XLS (76 episodes/719 case-years)
- PITF Revolutionary Wars 2004.XLS (64 episodes/472 case-years)
- PITF Adverse Regimes Changes 2004.XLS (112 episodes/284 case-years)
- PITF GenoPoliticides 2004.XLS (41 episodes/268 case-years)

=== Ethnic wars ===
80 cases; 16 ongoing

=== Revolutionary wars ===
65 cases; 4 ongoing

=== Adverse regime changes ===
115 cases; 2 ongoing

=== Genocide/politicides ===
41 cases; 1 ongoing

Average magnitude over all years: 2.4

Genocides/politicides occurred most frequently in 1975 and 1978. Frequency of occurrence increased beginning in 1962 until 1980, when frequency dropped slightly. The frequency of genocides/politicides plateaued from 1980 to 1987. In 1988 the world saw a slight increase of genocides/politicides, which then quickly turned into a steady decrease in events through 2011.

An example of a typical event: Uganda, 1980–1986. Average magnitude: 3.3.
