= Democracy in the Middle East and North Africa =

Map of V-Dem Electoral Democracy Index in the Middle East for 2025: 0.90–1.00 0.80–0.89 0.70–0.79 0.60–0.69 / 0.50–0.59 0.40–0.49 0.30–0.39 0.20–0.29 / 0.10–0.19 0.00–0.09 No data

The state of democracy in Middle East and North Africa can be comparatively assessed according to various definitions of democracy. De jure democracies in the Middle East and North Africa are according to system of government:

- Parliamentary republic: Iraq, Israel, Lebanon
- Presidential republic: Syria, Tunisia, Turkey
- Semi-presidential republic: Algeria, Egypt, Mauritania

The V-Dem Democracy indices ranked in 2024 Iraq, Israel, Mauritania and Tunisia as the Middle Eastern and North African countries with the highest democracy scores. The Economist Group's Democracy Index rated Cyprus and Israel as the only "flawed democracies" and no country as "full democracy" in the region for 2025.

Events of the Arab Spring such as the Tunisian Revolution may indicate a move towards democracy in some countries which may not be fully captured in the democracy index. In 2015, Tunisia became the first Arab country classified as free since the beginning of Lebanon's civil war 40 years ago. Theories are diverse on the subject. "Revisionist theories" argue that democracy is slightly incompatible with Middle Eastern values. On the other hand, "post-colonial" theories (such as those put forth by Edward Said) for the relative absence of democracy in the Middle East are diverse, from the long history of imperial rule by the Ottoman Empire, United Kingdom and France and the contemporary political and military intervention by the United States, all of which have been blamed for preferring authoritarian regimes because this ostensibly simplifies the business environment, while enriching the governing elite and the companies of the imperial countries. Other explanations include the problem that most of the states in the region are rentier states, which experience the theorized resource curse.

This article follows sources that place Cyprus in Europe, not the Middle East.

== History ==
The decline and fall of the Ottoman Empire set the stage for nationalist movements to emerge in Southwest Asia and North Africa as the Second French Empire, the Italian Empire, and British Empire began to target and colonize the region. The First 1877 Ottoman general election during the First Constitutional Era was the first general election in the Ottoman Empire. The century between 1820 and 1920 saw the Ottoman Empire shrink from encompassing the entirety of the Levant and Egypt, the Balkans, and significant portions of the coastal Maghreb and Arabian Peninsula, to less than half of the modern state of Turkey. Turkey declared a republic in 1923 by amending the Turkish Constitution of 1921. During this period, national self-determination movements began in reaction to both the spread of nationalism throughout Europe and to European colonial incursion prior to the Ottoman Empire's collapse.

Following the conclusion of World War I in 1918 and the fall of the Ottoman Empire in 1922, many former Ottoman territories not already under European control were colonized by European countries via League of Nations mandates. While European powers were instrumental in establishing the first independent governments that emerged from the Ottoman Empire, the mandatory period was brief, primarily spanning the interwar period and World War II. Interest in national self-determination further increased during the mandatory period, and accelerated as the process of decolonization began in the region following the end of World War II in 1948.

During decolonization, current and formerly colonized peoples of Southwest Asia, North Africa, and the horn of Africa grappled with significant political and economic upheaval, both internally and in response to neocolonialism from Western nations. Early Arab nationalism involved transforming ethnically diverse communities coping with the effects of experiencing imperial collapse, colonization, and decolonization in under a century, into a unitary national identity. For most of these emergent countries, democratic statehood was either out of reach due to political instability, or rejected in favor of other forms of government.

The Constitution of Lebanon adopted 1926 during French Mandate was based on the French constitution and guaranteed liberty and equality for all its citizens. The first election in Lebanon during French Mandate was 1922 with universal male suffrage. The first election after Lebanese independence in 1943 was the 1947 Lebanese general election. The 1949 Israeli Constituent Assembly election was the first Israeli election. The 1950 Turkish general election was the first free Turkish election.

During the Cold War, the United States of America and the Soviet Union competed for allies in Southwest Asia and North Africa, and the United States has been accused of supporting dictatorships contrary to its stated democratic principles. The 1957 Eisenhower Doctrine was the beginning of a policy of American democracy promotion in the Middle East and North Africa, leading, for example, to American intervention on behalf of the democratically elected government in the 1958 Lebanon crisis.

== Current state ==
Following the terrorist attacks of September 11, 2001, the U.S. war in Afghanistan and Iraq War represented a significant turning point for the United States' shift in foreign policy in the Muslim world. Although protests against the Iraq War in particular widely criticized American intervention as a form of neocolonialism, American political rhetoric during the Afghanistan and Iraq wars centered on the purpose of the wars being to bring democratization in the region, as the invasions of those countries were partly for purposes of organizing democratic governments.

Opponents of American intervention in Afghanistan and Iraq have, however, criticized that democracy cannot be imposed from outside. The two countries have since had relatively successful elections, Afghanistan only until 2021, but have also experienced serious security and development problems.

Some believe that democracy can be established "only through force" and the help of the United States. Writers such as Michele Dunne, when writing for the Carnegie Paper concurs with the rhetoric of the late Israeli prime minister Yitzhak Rabin (at that time, referring to peace and terrorism) that the foreign policy position of the US should be to 'pursue peace as though there were no democratization, and pursue democratization as though there were no peace. In other words, the U.S. government should pursue reform and democratization as policy goals in the first instance without worrying excessively about tradeoffs with other goals." The U.S. pressure behind the calling of the 2006 Palestinian legislative election backfired, resulting in the democratically sound victory of Hamas, rather than the US-supported Fatah. Drawing upon the ideas of Middle East scholar Nicola Pratt it can be argued that:

…the outcome of democratization efforts is [in reality]…contingent upon the degree to which actors' chosen strategies contribute to either reproducing or challenging the relations of power between civil society and the state.

However, recent academic critics have characterized intervention in the Middle East as a means towards engendering democracy a failure. The 2011 study Costs of War from Brown University's Watson Institute for International Studies concluded that democracy promotion has been flawed from the beginning in both Iraq and Afghanistan, with corruption rampant in both countries as the United States prepares to withdraw many of its combat troops. On a scale of corruption established by Transparency International, Iraq and Afghanistan are two of the worst-ranked countries in the world, surpassed in corruption by only Myanmar and Somalia. Despite high corruption, Iraq was the third most democratic country in the Middle East and North Africa in 2024.

There are a number of pro-democracy movements in the Middle East. A prominent figure in this movement is Saad Eddin Ibrahim who advocates and campaigns for democracy in Egypt and the wider region, working with the Ibn Khaldun Centre for Development Studies and serving on the Board of Advisors for the Project on Middle East Democracy.

When asked about his thoughts regarding the current state of democracy in the region he said:

People's memories... have become tuned or conditioned to thinking that the problems in the Middle East must be a chronic condition, not that they are only 30 years old, and not realizing that the reason for the current state of the Middle East was first, the Arab-Israeli conflict, and two, the Cold War. The Cold War made the United States and other western democracies look the other way when it came to political oppression and allowed them to deal with tyrants and dictators.

The Middle East Forum, a think tank based in Philadelphia, recently published their table for measurement of democracy within Middle Eastern states. Their contention is that little has changed, post-September 11, 2001, and if anything the "war on terror" has enabled many regimes to stifle democratic progress. The results showed very little progress from 1999 to 2005. The report even states that this pattern may be counter-productive to US interests, with Islamism being the only viable opposition to regimes in many Middle Eastern countries. As an additional measure of US attitudes towards the issue of Middle Eastern democratization, on 14 December 2006, the US Secretary of state Condoleezza Rice stated that democracy in the Middle East was "non-negotiable."

Middle East scholar Louise Fawcett notes how the United Nations Development Programme's Arab Human Development Report 2002, drafted by Western-educated Arab intellectuals, is modelled "on universal democratic principles." In addition, Fawcett argues that "Constitutional democracy is viewed not only as an intrinsic good by the putative globalisers who drafted this Report; it is also an instrumental necessity if the region is to stop stagnating and begin to catch up with the rest of the world."

The level of democratic process varies widely from country to country. A few countries, such as Saudi Arabia, do not claim to be democracies; however, most of the larger states claim to be democracies, although this claim is in most cases disputed.

== Measures of democracy ==
There are several that publish and maintain democracy indices in the world, according to their own various definitions of the term, and rank countries according to various measures of democracy, including elections, political rights, and freedom of the press.

=== V-Dem Democracy indices ===
Israel

Lebanon

Tunisia

Iraq

V-Dem Democracy Indices (v16; to 2025 inclusive) for electoral democracy (solid) and liberal democracy (dotted) for the four countries in the region with the highest democracy ratings as of 2025. The time scales start at different years because of the countries' different histories and data availability.

The table below shows how countries score on the 2026 V-Dem Democracy Indices.

Country	Democracy Indices		Democracy Component Indices			
Country	Electoral	Liberal	Liberal	Egalitarian	Participatory	Deliberative
Israel	0.69	0.59	0.85	0.78	0.6	0.71
Lebanon	0.42	0.27	0.54	0.5	0.42	0.76
Tunisia	0.4	0.26	0.57	0.73	0.51	0.75
Iraq	0.37	0.22	0.48	0.41	0.49	0.62
Mauritania	0.33	0.13	0.25	0.29	0.53	0.56
Turkey	0.29	0.11	0.23	0.54	0.4	0.13
Jordan	0.28	0.27	0.76	0.56	0.31	0.74
Algeria	0.26	0.13	0.3	0.57	0.2	0.48
Morocco	0.26	0.25	0.72	0.56	0.39	0.81
Palestine (West Bank)	0.21	0.11	0.31	0.56	0.44	0.17
Libya	0.19	0.1	0.28	0.36	0.24	0.84
Egypt	0.19	0.12	0.34	0.31	0.21	0.36
Oman	0.18	0.14	0.44	0.56	0.37	0.21
Iran	0.16	0.1	0.32	0.5	0.1	0.28
Bahrain	0.14	0.06	0.19	0.43	0.16	0.18
Kuwait	0.14	0.13	0.43	0.59	0.15	0.6
Palestine (Gaza)	0.13	0.06	0.18	0.4	0.22	0.13
Syria	0.13	0.05	0.17	0.43	0.18	0.59
Yemen	0.13	0.04	0.12	0.09	0.23	0.11
United Arab Emirates	0.1	0.08	0.26	0.44	0.09	0.29
Qatar	0.03	0.09	0.35	0.39	0.13	0.47
Saudi Arabia	0.02	0.05	0.18	0.45	0.1	0.28

== Forms of government ==
Summary table of forms of government in the Middle East and North Africa
Form of Government	Countries
Absolute monarchy	Oman, Saudi Arabia
Semi-constitutional monarchy	Bahrain, Qatar, Kuwait, Morocco, United Arab Emirates
Constitutional monarchy	Jordan
Islamic republic	Iran
Parliamentary republic	Iraq, Israel, Lebanon, and Libya
Semi-presidential republic	Algeria, Egypt, Mauritania, (Note: The Islamic Republic of Mauritania is a semi-presidential republic with no theocratic elements in its system of government) Palestine
Presidential republic	Syria, Tunisia, Turkey, Yemen

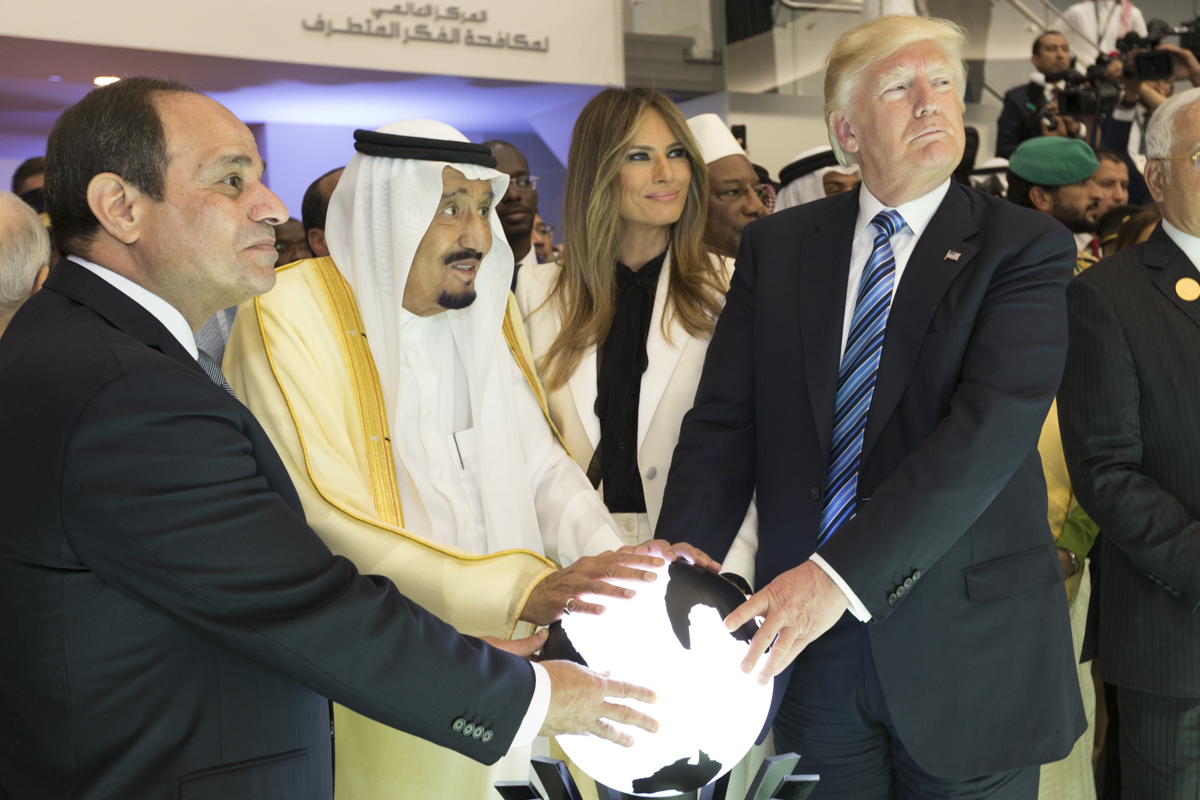
King Salman of Saudi Arabia, Egyptian President Abdel Fattah el-Sisi and U.S. President Donald Trump at the 2017 Riyadh Summit

=== Absolute monarchy ===
Saudi Arabia and Oman are the only absolute monarchies in the Middle East. Saudi Arabia and Oman have some elections at the municipal level.

=== Constitutional monarchy ===
Bahrain, Jordan, Kuwait, Morocco, Qatar and the United Arab Emirates are constitutional monarchies. Kuwait's constitutional monarchy is considered one of the more liberal democratic countries in the region with regular elections in Kuwait, despite regular dissolutions of the National Assembly of Kuwait.

=== Islamic republic ===
Iran is the only Islamic Republic in the Middle East and holds regular elections for its president, parliament, and Assembly of Experts. The Assembly of Experts elects the Supreme Leader of Iran. However, all candidates in elections must be approved by the Guardian Council, which is appointed directly or indirectly by the Supreme Leader.

=== Parliamentary republic ===
There are three parliamentary democracies in the Middle East that regularly hold elections: Lebanon, Iraq, and Israel. Libya held parliamentary elections in 2014 and local elections during 2019–2021 and 2024–2026.

=== Presidential republic ===
Five presidential republics, Algeria, Egypt, Mauritania, Tunisia, and Turkey, regularly hold elections. Since the fall of the Assad regime, the Syrian transitional government has not held elections in Syria. Yemen's most recent presidential and parliamentary elections were in 2012 and 2003. Palestine's most recent presidential and parliamentary elections were in 2005 and 2006.

== By country ==
=== Algeria ===
Algeria elects on the national level a head of state – the president – and a legislature. The president is elected for a five-year term by the people. People's National Assembly (Assemblée Populaire Nationale) has 407 members, elected for a five-year term in multi-seat constituencies by proportional representation. Eight seats in the national assembly are reserved for Algerians abroad. The Council of the Nation (Conseil de la nation) has 174 members, 116 members elected by communal councils and 58 members appointed by the president. The V-Dem Institute Democracy Report classified Algeria as an electoral autocracy. Restrictive nomination rules prevent competitive elections.

=== Iran ===
==== History of political systems ====
Historically Iranians were ruled by an absolute monarchy for several thousand years, at least since the time of the Achaemenid Empire (550 B.C.E.) until the Constitutional Revolution in the early 20th century. The Constitutional Revolution in 1906 replaced the absolute monarchy with a constitutional monarchy. The constitution went under several revisions during the following decades. During World War II Iran stayed neutral but in 1941 the Allies (the USSR and Great Britain) invaded Iran and replaced Iran's Shah Reza Pahlavi (who was perceived as being pro-German) with his son Mohammad Reza Pahlavi to protect their access to Iranian oil, and to secure routes to ship western military aid to the Soviet Union. Iran's parliamentary government led by Prime Minister Mohammed Mosaddeq was toppled in a 1953 coup d'état by royalist forces supported and funded by CIA and MI6 after Mohammed Mosaddeq nationalized Iranian oil. Shah Mohammad Reza Pahlavi became the preeminent leader in Iran, and instated Fazlollah Zahedi from the military as the new Prime Minister. United States has considered the Shah as a close ally and Iran as its main base in the Middle East. The Shah also tried to modernize Iran's economy and westernize Iran's culture. These and other policies contributed to alienating nationalists, leftists, and religious groups.

The monarchy was overthrown in 1979 by the Iranian Revolution. In the same year a referendum was held by Ruhollah Khomeini, that asked whether there should be an 'Islamic Republic' or not. The 1979 referendum (in favor of an Islamic Republic) got 98% support of those who voted. The constitution was modeled on the 1958 constitution of the French Fifth Republic by the Assembly of Experts for Constitution (who were elected by direct popular vote) and Khomeini made himself the new Supreme Leader of Iran. The constitution received above 99% support in another 1979 referendum. After Khomeini's death, the Assembly of Experts (which is made of Islamic scholars elected by direct vote) appointed Ali Khamenei as the new Supreme Leader. The constitution was also amended through a referendum in 1989 with 97% support a few months before Ayatollah Ruhollah Khomeini died increasing the powers of Supreme Leader. Iran holds regular national elections by universal suffrage for all citizens (regardless of race, religion, or sex, who are of voting age) for electing the President, members of Parliament, Assembly of Experts, City and Village Councils where political parties support candidates.

==== Issues with the current political system ====
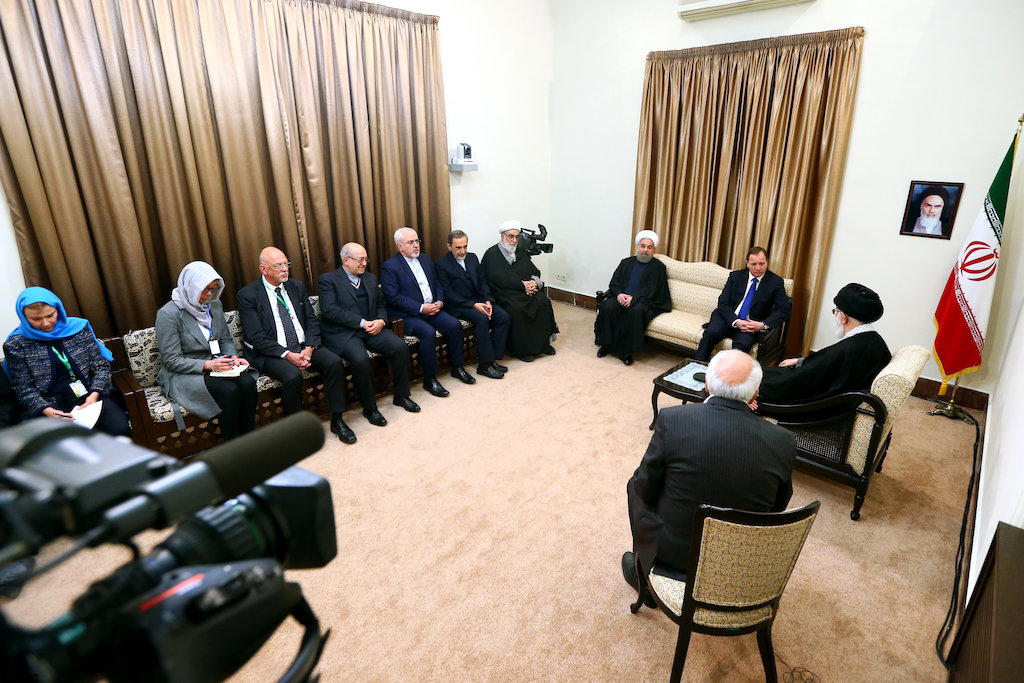
Iranian leaders Ali Khamenei and Hassan Rouhani with Swedish Prime Minister Stefan Löfven, Tehran, 2017

The current political system in Iran was designed to allow Iranians to decide their future by themselves without being oppressed by authorities, but in practice only allows a limited democracy. One of the main problems of Iran's system is the consolidation of too much power in the hands of the Supreme Leader of Iran who is elected by the Assembly of Experts with no term limit (unless the Assembly of Experts decides to remove him, which has never happened). The power of the Supreme Leader under Iran's constitution is almost unlimited and unrestricted in practice. This combined with the view that he is the representative of God held by some religious groups, being the head of the security and armed forces, and controlling the official state media (the radio and television are restricted to state radio and television) makes him immune from any kind of criticism and unchallengeable. Critics of the system or the Supreme Leader are punished severely. Critical newspapers and political parties are closed, social and political activists like writers, journalists, human right activists, university students, union leaders, lawyers, and politicians are jailed for unreasonably long periods for making simple criticism against the Supreme Leader, the Islamic Republic system, Islam and Shia doctrines, the government, and other officials. They have been even threatened by death sentence (though all such verdict in recent years have been dropped in higher courts in recent years) and some have been assassinated by the Ministry of Intelligence and militias in the past (no such case has been reported in recent years).

Another main problem is the closed loop in the electoral system, the elected Assembly of Experts elects the Supreme Leader, so in theory he is elected indirectly by popular vote, but in practice the system does not satisfy the criteria for a free election since the Supreme Leader appoints the members of the Guardian Council who in turn vet the candidates for all elections including the elections for Assembly of Experts. This loop limits the possible candidates to those agreeing with the views held by Supreme Leader and he has the final say over all important issues.

Several articles of the constitution of Iran about political freedoms and minority rights (e.g. education in mother language for language minorities) have not been applied at all. The fourth unchangeable article of constitution states that all other articles of the constitution and all other laws are void if they violate Islamic rules, and the Guardian Council is given the duty of interpreting the constitution and verifying that all laws passed the parliament are not against Islamic laws (censorship in Islamic societies).

Other problems include the issues with the rights of racial and religious minorities, influence and involvement of armed forces especially the Islamic Revolutionary Guard Corps and Basij in political activities, censorship in Iran, corruption in Iran, problems with security forces like police and militias like Ansar-e Hezbollah.

==== Public opinion of Iranians regarding the political system of 2011–2012 ====
Polls in 2011 and 2012 in Iran by a number of respected Western polling organizations showed that a considerable majority of Iranians supported the system, including the religious institutions, and trusted the system's handling of elections (including the disputed presidential elections in 2009). Some Iranians and political activists dispute the results of these polls arguing that the results of these polls cannot be trusted because people fear to express their real opinion and the limitations on the follow of information allows the state to control the opinion of people living in more traditional parts of the country. Some of these polling organizations have responded to these claims and defended their results as correctly showing the current opinion of Iranians. The polls also showed a divide between the population living in large modern cities like Tehran and people living in other more traditional and conservative parts of the country like rural areas and smaller cities.

=== Iraq ===
Democracy in Iraq is a fledgling process, but Iraq achieved a more democratic approach than most surrounding countries. Iraq has a score of 3.51 out of ten on the 2021 The Economist Democracy Index, which is considered authoritarian. Iraq scored 0.362 on the V-Dem Electoral Democracy Index in 2023, ranking 3rd in the Middle East and 115th worldwide. Numerous wars, corruption, and civil and ethnic conflict in Iraq have made it difficult for a stable democratic government to emerge.

According to the Constitution of Iraq, the Iraqi government is a federal parliamentary representative democratic republic. It is a multi-party system whereby the executive power is exercised by the Prime Minister of the Council of Ministers as the head of government, as well as the President of Iraq, and legislative power is vested in the Council of Representatives. The Prime Minister of Iraq appoints the Council of Ministers, which acts as the cabinet.

=== Israel ===
Israel is a parliamentary democracy represented by a large number of parties, with universal suffrage for all citizens, regardless of race, religion, sex, or sexual orientation, who are of voting age. Often recognized as the only functional democracy in the Middle East, Israel has been a Jewish and democratic state since its establishment in 1948, with an elected government led by a prime minister. However, the application of democracy to Israel's Palestinian citizens and the selective application of Israeli democracy in the Israeli-occupied Palestinian territories have been criticized. The claim that Israel's policies for Palestinians amount to apartheid has been affirmed by the Israeli human rights organizations B'tselem and Yesh Din, and international human rights organizations such as Amnesty International and Human Rights Watch.

==== Israeli-occupied territories ====
Some scholars and commentators, including Ilan Pappé, Baruch Kimmerling, and Meron Benvenisti, have characterized Israel as a Herrenvolk democracy due to Israel's de facto control of the occupied territories whose native inhabitants may not vote in Israeli elections. Henry Siegman, a former national director of the American Jewish Congress, has said that the network of settlements in the West Bank has created an "irreversible colonial project" aimed to foreclose the possibility of a viable Palestinian state.

The treatment of Palestinians within the occupied territories have drawn widespread accusations that Israel is guilty of apartheid, a crime against humanity under the Rome Statute and the International Convention on the Suppression and Punishment of the Crime of Apartheid. The Washington Post's 2021 survey of scholars and academic experts on the Middle East found an increase from 59% to 65% of these scholars describing Israel as a "one-state reality akin to apartheid". Accusations of Israel of apartheid were welcomed by Palestinians and the Arab League. In 2022, Michael Lynk, a Canadian law professor appointed by the UN Human Rights Council said that the situation met the legal definition of apartheid, and concluded: "Israel has imposed upon Palestine an apartheid reality in a post-apartheid world". Subsequent reports from his successor, Francesca Albanese, and from Permanent United Nations Fact Finding Mission on the Israel Palestine conflict chair Navi Pillay echoed the opinion.

In February 2024, the ICJ held public hearings in regards to the legal consequences arising from the policies and practices of Israel in the occupied Palestinian territory including East Jerusalem. During the hearings, 24 states and three international organizations said that Israeli practices amount to a breach of the prohibition of apartheid and/or amount to prohibited acts of racial discrimination. The International Court of Justice in its 2024 advisory opinion found that Israel's occupation of the Palestinian territories constitutes systemic discrimination and is in breach of Article 3 of the International Convention on the Elimination of All Forms of Racial Discrimination. The opinion is silent as to whether the discrimination amounts to apartheid; individual judges were split on the question.

According to Henry Siegman, Israel has "crossed the threshold from 'the only democracy in the Middle East' to the only apartheid regime in the Western world". He argues that denying Palestinians both self-determination and Israeli citizenship amounts to a "double disenfranchisement", which when based on ethnicity amounts to racism, and that reserving democracy for privileged citizens and keeping others "behind checkpoints and barbed wire fences" is the opposite of democracy.

Amnesty's claim of apartheid in Israel was criticised by politicians and representatives from Israel and its closest allies such as, the US, the UK, the European Commission, Australia, Netherlands and Germany. Sammy Smooha, Ilan Peleg, Nachman Ben-Yehuda, Adi Ophir, have asserted that characterizing Israel as Herrenvolk democracy is incorrect, variously describing Israel as a liberal democracy, ethnic democracy, illiberal democracy or a hybrid regime.

=== Palestine ===
Following the establishment of Mandatory Palestine, elections of the Jewish community to the Assembly of Representatives (Mandatory Palestine) started with the 1920 Assembly of Representatives election. Due to an Arab boycott of the 1923 Palestinian Legislative Council election by the fifth Palestine Arab Congress the results of this election were annulled and an Advisory Council was appointed instead. The first legislative and presidential elections by the Palestinian National Authority were held in 1996 and the first local elections were held in January–May 2005. Previous municipal elections were held in 1972 and 1976, organized by the Israeli government. The most recent elections held in the West Bank were the 2021–22 Palestinian local elections.

The 2024 V-Dem Democracy indices ranked the Gaza Strip and the West Bank separately, classifying the West Bank as an "electoral autocracy" and the Gaza Strip as a "closed autocracy." According to a 2024 Freedom House report, Israel's blockade of Gaza, alongside the Hamas-Fatah rift, has "hampered the development of normal civilian political competition" in the Gaza Strip.

=== Jordan ===
Elections in Jordan are for the lower house, known as the House of Representatives, of the bicameral parliament of Jordan, as well as for local elections. They take place within a political system where the King has extensive legislative and executive powers, retaining ultimate political control. The Prime Minister is selected by the King, the PM is then free to choose his own Cabinet. The parliament has quotas: three seats for Circassians and Chechens, nine for Christians and fifteen for women. The electoral system favours rural tribes and those of East Bank origin over urban areas that are primarily inhabited by those of Palestinian descent.

=== Kuwait ===
Elections in Kuwait are held for the National Assembly. Kuwait's constitution calls for elections to the unicameral National Assembly at a maximum interval of four years. Elections are held earlier if the Constitutional Court or Emir dissolve the parliament.

=== Lebanon ===
Lebanon has traditionally enjoyed a confessional democratic system, with certain high-profile positions in the government and seats in the parliament reserved for specified religions and confessions. A large number of political parties with very different ideologies are active in the Parliament of Lebanon, but most of them form political alliances with other groups of similar interests. Political fragmentation in Lebanon contributes to political inefficiency.

The 2024 V-Dem Democracy report stated that Lebanon is autocratizing. Lebanon was ranked 112th electoral democracy in the world according to the V-Dem Democracy Indices published in 2024.

=== Libya ===
Due to the Libyan crisis last elections were the 2014 Libyan parliamentary election and 2024–2026 Libyan local elections. Political fragmentation prevents new elections in Libya.

=== Morocco ===
Elections in Morocco are held at the national, regional, and local levels. At the national level, they are used to elect members of the Parliament, which is bicameral and consists of two chambers.

=== Mauritania ===
Mauritania has a presidential election every five years, in which a president of Mauritania is elected in two rounds on the basis of a direct popular vote.

Parliamentary elections for the National Assembly are held every five years with a parallel voting system combining several national lists and an electoral district vote, with a two-round system used for one-seat districts, a general ticket used for two-seat districts, with larger districts using the proportional largest remainder method. Mauritania has a multi-party system with a dominant ruling party holding an absolute majority supported by several minor parties (with this bloc being referred to as the "presidential majority"). Mauritania has a high number of parties, with a peak of 105 parties running in 2018.

=== Tunisia ===
The V-Dem Democracy Report identified for the year 2023 U-Turn democratization in Tunisia.

=== Turkey ===
Turkey has undergone both democratization and democratic backsliding since its establishment in 1923. It functioned as a one-party state from its establishment until 1945, when it transitioned to a multi-party system. Turkey was democratizing in the 1960s, before experiencing a resurgence of authoritarianism following the 1980 Turkish coup d'état. After the 1983 Turkish general election, a period of democratization followed. Under Recep Tayyip Erdoğan and the AK Party, Turkey has experienced increasing authoritarianism, democratic backsliding, and suppression of dissent. Contemporary elections in Turkey have been criticized as unfair due to political censorship. Scholars have characterized Turkey as an ethnocracy, and some argue that it has never been a democracy due to its lackluster human rights record and history of coup attempts.

== Democratization ==
The reasons for the lack of democratization in the Middle East are outlined by analysts such as Albrecht Schnabel, who says that a strong civil society is required to produce leaders and mobilize the public around democratic duties, but in order for such a civil society to flourish, a democratic environment and process allowing freedom of expression and order is required in the first place. This theory, therefore, supports the intervention of outside countries, such as the U.S., in establishing democracy. "If domestic capacities are lacking, external support may be required. Externally supported creation of fragile, yet somewhat functioning institutions is meant to trigger the momentum needed to encourage the evolution of a functioning civil society. The latter will, after a few years of consolidation and post-conflict stability, produce the first wholly internally crafted government. At that time, external involvement, if still provided at that point, can cede." Schnabel argues that democratization in the Middle East must come from both below and above, given that pressure from below will be pointless if the political leadership is opposed to reform, while top-down reform (which has been the norm in the Middle East) is not a fruitful endeavor if the political culture in society is not developed.

Other analysts draw different conclusions. Drawing from the work of Alexis de Tocqueville and Robert Putnam, these researchers suggest that independent, nongovernmental associations help foster a participatory form of governance. They cite the lack of horizontal voluntary association as a reason for the persistence of authoritarianism in the region. Other analysts believe that the lack of a market-driven economy in many Middle Eastern countries undermines the capacity to build the kind of individual autonomy and power that helps promote democracy.

Therefore, the relationship of the state to civil society is one of the most important indicators of the chances of democracy evolving in a particular country. Poverty, inequality, and low literacy rates also compromise people's commitment to democratic reforms since survival becomes a higher priority. Some analysts point to MENA's saturation with Islam as an explanation for the region's failure to democratize.

Other analysts believe that the failure of democratization results from the power of the state. Inspired by Skopcol's work on revolution, Belin argues that democratic transition can only be carried out when the state's coercive apparatus lacks the will or capacity to crush opponents. Authoritarianism has been exceptionally robust in the MENA region because many of the states have proven willing and able to crush reform initiatives. Moreover, almost every Arab state has been directly involved in some form of international conflict over the past decades. Research suggests that conflict involvement has a direct influence on the country's prospects for democratization.

However, critics of these theories observe that countries outside the Middle East and North Africa that experience similar democracy-inhibiting factors are more successful in their quest for democratization.

=== Arab Spring ===
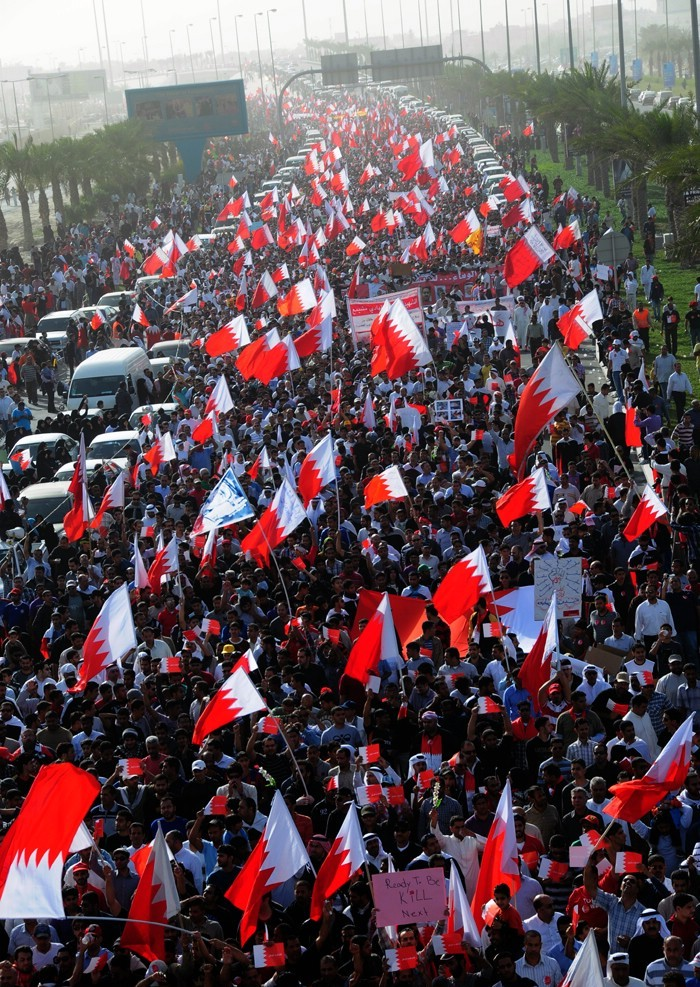
Over 100,000 people in Bahrain taking part in the "March of Loyalty to Martyrs", honoring political dissidents killed by security forces

The protests, uprisings and revolutions in the Middle East and North Africa, beginning on 18 December 2010, brought about the overthrow of the Tunisian and Egyptian governments. Libya was brought into a 6-month civil war which brought about the end of Gaddafi's 41-year rule. Bahrain and Yemen experienced uprisings. The uprising in Syria led to full-scale civil war that culminated in the Fall of the Assad regime on 8 December 2024. Tunisia and Egypt have held elections that were considered fair by observers. Mohamed Morsi was sworn in as Egypt's first president to gain power through an election on 30 June 2012; however, after protests against him in June 2013, as well as a 48-hour deadline by the Egyptian Armed Forces to respond to the protesters' demands that he did not comply with, Morsi was removed from office in July 2013. Morsi's Defence Minister, Abdel Fattah el-Sisi, who served as a general in the Egyptian Armed Forces at the time, was responsible for announcing the overthrow on state television. Many other countries in the region are also calling for democracy and freedom, including: Algeria, Armenia, Azerbaijan, Djibouti, Iran, Iraq, Jordan, Oman, Yemen, Kuwait, Mauritania, Morocco, Saudi Arabia, Sudan and Turkey. Research confirms that (in general) people in Islamic societies support democracy.

== Relation to Islam ==
- Islam and democracy
- Islam and secularism
- Censorship in Islamic societies

== See also ==
- Human rights in the Middle East
- Women in the Arab world
- United States foreign policy in the Middle East
- American democracy promotion in the Middle East and North Africa
- Democratic peace theory
- Ethnic democracy
- Religious democracy
- Territorial peace theory
- Democracy in Africa
- Democracy in the Americas
- Democracy in Asia
- Democracy in Europe
