= Herrenvolk democracy =

Form of government in which only one ethnic group can vote

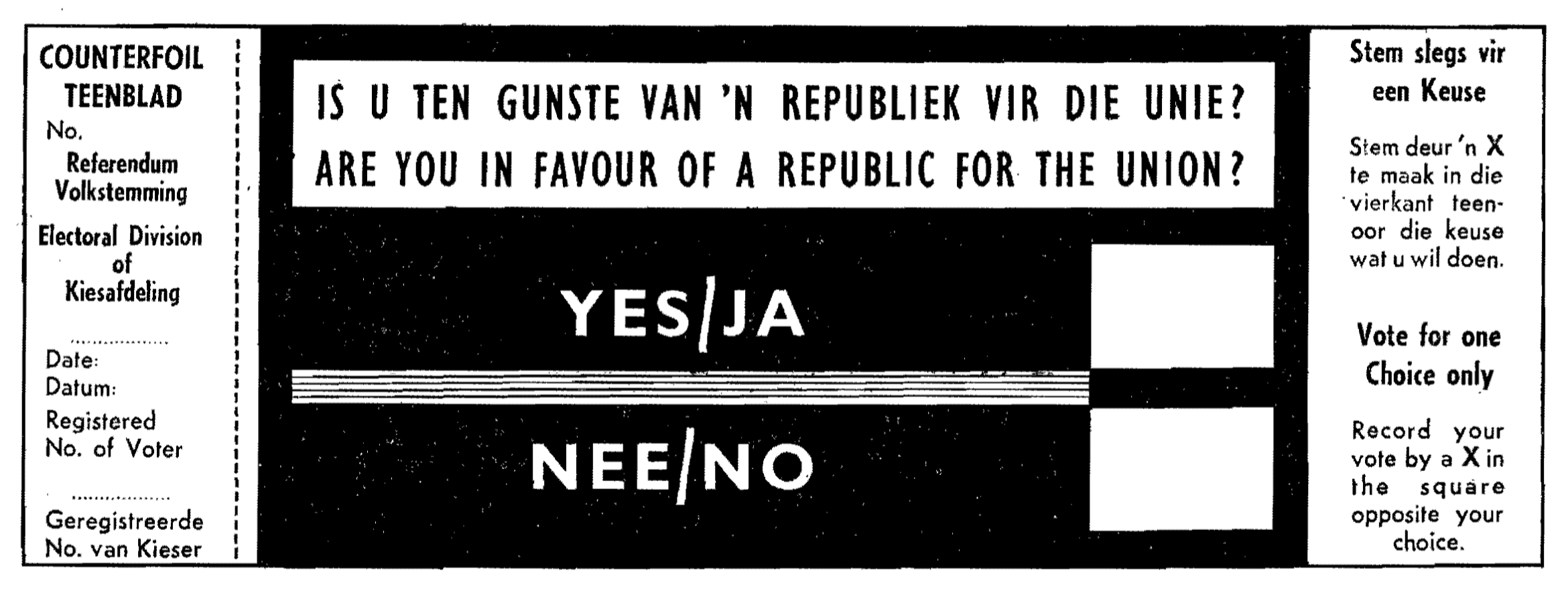
A ballot paper from the 1960 South African republic referendum, in which only white people were allowed to vote—the first such national election in the union

Herrenvolk democracy (German pronunciation: [ˈhɛʁənfɔlk]) is a partially democratic form of government in which only a specific ethnic group has voting rights and the right to run for office, while other groups are disenfranchised. Herrenvolk democracy is a subtype of ethnocracy, which refers to any form of government where one ethnic group dominates the state, with or without elections. Elections are generally free, but voting suffrage was restricted based on race, with governance that reflected the interests of the politically dominant racial group. The German term Herrenvolk, meaning "master race", was used in nineteenth century discourse that justified German colonialism with the supposed racial superiority of Europeans.

The United States prior to the civil rights movement and with particular starkness during the period of the Confederate States of America (1861–1865), South Africa under apartheid (1948–1994), and Liberia (1847–1946) are described as examples of Herrenvolk democracy. The State of Israel's (1967–) occupation of the Palestinian territories has also been characterized as a Herrenvolk democracy by some scholars. The unrecognised Southern African country of Rhodesia (1965–1979) maintained a minoritarian system that mirrored aspects of herrenvolk democracy, but did not restrict its political franchise to members of the dominant ethnic or racial class, choosing economic and financial criteria instead.

== Characteristics ==
This form of government is typically employed by an ethnic group or groups to maintain control and power within the system. It is often accompanied with a pretense of egalitarianism. As people of the dominant ethnic group gain freedom and liberty and egalitarian principles are advanced, other ethnic groups are repressed and prevented from being involved in the government.

The term was first used in 1967 by Pierre van den Berghe in his book Race and Racism.

== Examples ==
In his 1991 book The Wages of Whiteness, historian David R. Roediger reinterprets this form of government in the context of 19th-century United States, arguing that the term "Herrenvolk republicanism" more accurately describes racial politics at this time. The basis of Herrenvolk republicanism went beyond the marginalization of black people in favor of a republican government serving the "master race"; it contended that "blackness" was synonymous with dependency and servility and was, therefore, antithetical to republican independence and white freedom. Consequently, the dependent white worker at this time used his whiteness to differentiate himself from and elevate himself over the dependent black worker or enslaved person. According to this ideology, black people were not merely "non-citizens"; they were "anti-citizens" who inherently opposed the ideals of a republican government.. The Naturalization Act of 1790 limited the path to citizenship specifically to "free white persons". In Dred Scott v. Sandford (1857), the Supreme Court explicitly ruled that Black people—whether enslaved or free—could never be citizens of the United States and had "no rights which the white man was bound to respect".

This principle can be seen in the development of both the United States—especially the Southern states—and South Africa in the 19th and 20th centuries. In these historical scenarios, even as legislation moved toward universal male suffrage and later toward universal suffrage for white people, it also further entrenched restrictions on political participation by black people and upheld their disenfranchisement.

According to sociologist Michael West, Southern Rhodesia and later Rhodesia adopted a voting franchise based on income, property ownership, and literacy qualifications which was not a whites-only "herrenvolk democracy" as practiced in neighboring South Africa. West notes that the Rhodesian system was "unlike" a herrenvolk democracy in that sense, although it still upheld white supremacy by imposing strict economic qualifications which only permitted a relatively small number of black Africans to participate in the democratic process.

In their discussion of South Africa as a herrenvolk democracy, sociologists Chester Hunt and Lewis Walker found that the Rhodesian system could not confine citizenship and representative government to the "herrenvolk" because it was simply too small - white Rhodesians never made up more than five percent of the country's total population. Hunt and Walker argued that this practical reality forced white Rhodesians to accept compromises that resulted in a slightly more pluralistic system as opposed to South Africa's herrenvolk democracy, albeit one in which they continued to enjoy disproportionate influence.

After the Reconstruction era, the Southern states of the United States introduced the "Jim Crow laws" introduced literacy requirements and poll taxes effectively disfranchising millions of African Americans until the Civil Rights Act of 1964. This resulted in a one-party system called the Solid South, in which a candidate's victory in primary elections of the Democratic Party was tantamount to election to the office itself. White primaries were another means that the Democrats used to consolidate their political power, excluding blacks from voting.

Liberia became a de facto one-party state under True Whig Party even though opposition parties were never banned. Voting was restricted to descendants of Americo-Liberians until 1946. However, Americo-Liberians continued to dominate politics under the party until the 1980 Liberian coup d'état. Liberian nationality law is not alone:

At least half a dozen [African] countries effectively ensure that those from certain ethnic groups can never obtain nationality from birth; nor can their children nor their children’s children. At the most extreme end, Liberia and Sierra Leone, both founded by freed slaves, take the position that only those of “Negro” (Liberia) or “NegroAfrican” (Sierra Leone) descent can be citizens from birth. Sierra Leone also provides for more restrictive rules for naturalisation of “non-negro-Africans”, while Liberia provides that those not “of Negro descent” are not only excluded from citizenship from birth, but, “in order to preserve, foster, and maintain the positive Liberian culture, values, and character”, are prohibited from becoming citizens even by naturalisation.

— Manby, 2016

Some scholars and commentators, including Ilan Pappé, Baruch Kimmerling, and Meron Benvenisti, have characterized Israel as a Herrenvolk democracy due to Israel's de facto control of the occupied territories whose Palestinian citizens may not vote in Israeli elections. Others, such as Sammy Smooha, Ilan Peleg, Nachman Ben-Yehuda, Adi Ophir, have asserted that this characterization is invalid, variously describing the Israeli regime as a liberal democracy, ethnic democracy, illiberal democracy or a "hybrid regime".

== Related concepts ==
=== Ethnic democracy ===
The term ethnic democracy has sometimes been used with either the same or a different meaning as Herrenvolk democracy. The former term was first introduced by Professor Juan José Linz of Yale University in 1975, who defined it as functionally synonymous with Herrenvolk democracy: "a political system that is democratic for the dominant group but excludes, on the basis of ethnicity, other groups from the democratic process". However, it was subsequently and independently used by University of Haifa sociologist Professor Sammy Smooha in a book published in 1989, as a universalised model of the nature of the Israeli state. Unlike Linz, Smooha and a number of other scholars have used the term to refer to a type of state that differs from Herrenvolk democracy (or ethnocracy) in having more purely democratic elements: they argue that Israel and other purported "ethnic democracies" provide the non-core groups with more political participation, influence and improvement of status than is typical under a Herrenvolk state. However, critical scholars have argued that the so-called "ethnic democracies" are not fundamentally different from Herrenvolk democracies or ethnocracies, or that the differences are of degree rather than kind. According to these critics, Herrenvolk democracy and ethnic democracy both share numerous key features, in particular hegemonic control and tyranny of the majority, but differ in tactics: when the minority is unmanageable or outright ceases to be a numerical minority, the dominant ethnic group resorts to the more repressive tactics of Herrenvolk democracy, but when the non-dominant ethnicities are smaller or weaker, the dominant group maintains a façade of democracy.

=== Ethnocracy ===
The term "ethnocracy" was initially defined by Oren Yiftachel as a model for describing and understanding Israel, as "a non-democratic regime which attempts to extend or preserve disproportional ethnic control over a contested multiethnic territory". Today, ethnocracies generally make at least some attempts to erect a thin democratic façade. Yiftachel distinguishes ethnocracy by noting that "[s]ignificant (though partial) civil and political rights are extended to minority members, distinguishing ethnocracies from Herrenvolk or authoritarian regimes." Similarly, interpreting Yiftachel's model, Sammy Smooha has noted that while ethnocracy, like Herrenvolk democracy, is not truly democratic, it distinguishes itself from the latter in having "universal suffrage and democratic institutions".

== See also ==
- Crime of apartheid
- Dominant minority
- Ethnic democracy
- Ethnic nationalism
- Planter class
- Voter suppression
- Welfare chauvinism
- Australian Indigenous advisory bodies

== Bibliography ==
- Roediger, David R. (1997). The Wages of Whiteness. Philadelphia: Verso Books. ISBN 9781844671458.
