= Ethnic politics =

Ethnic politics may refer to:

- Ethnocultural politics in the United States
- Ethnic party
- Ethnic democracy
- Ethnocracy
- Ethnic nationalism
- Diaspora politics

== See also ==
- Ethnic vote
- Identity politics
- Ethnic conflict
