= Palestinians in Israel =

Palestinians in Israel may refer to:

- Arab citizens of Israel
  - Terms for Arab citizens of Israel
- Palestinian workers in Israel, non-citizen Palestinians employed in Israel, who cross from their homes in Palestine for work
