= Siegman =

Siegman is a surname. Notable people with the surname include:

- Anthony E. Siegman (1931–2011), American electrical engineer and educator
- Elena Siegman, American singer, guitarist, songwriter and video game producer
- Henry Siegman (born 1930), German-born American academic
