= Democracy promotion by the United States =

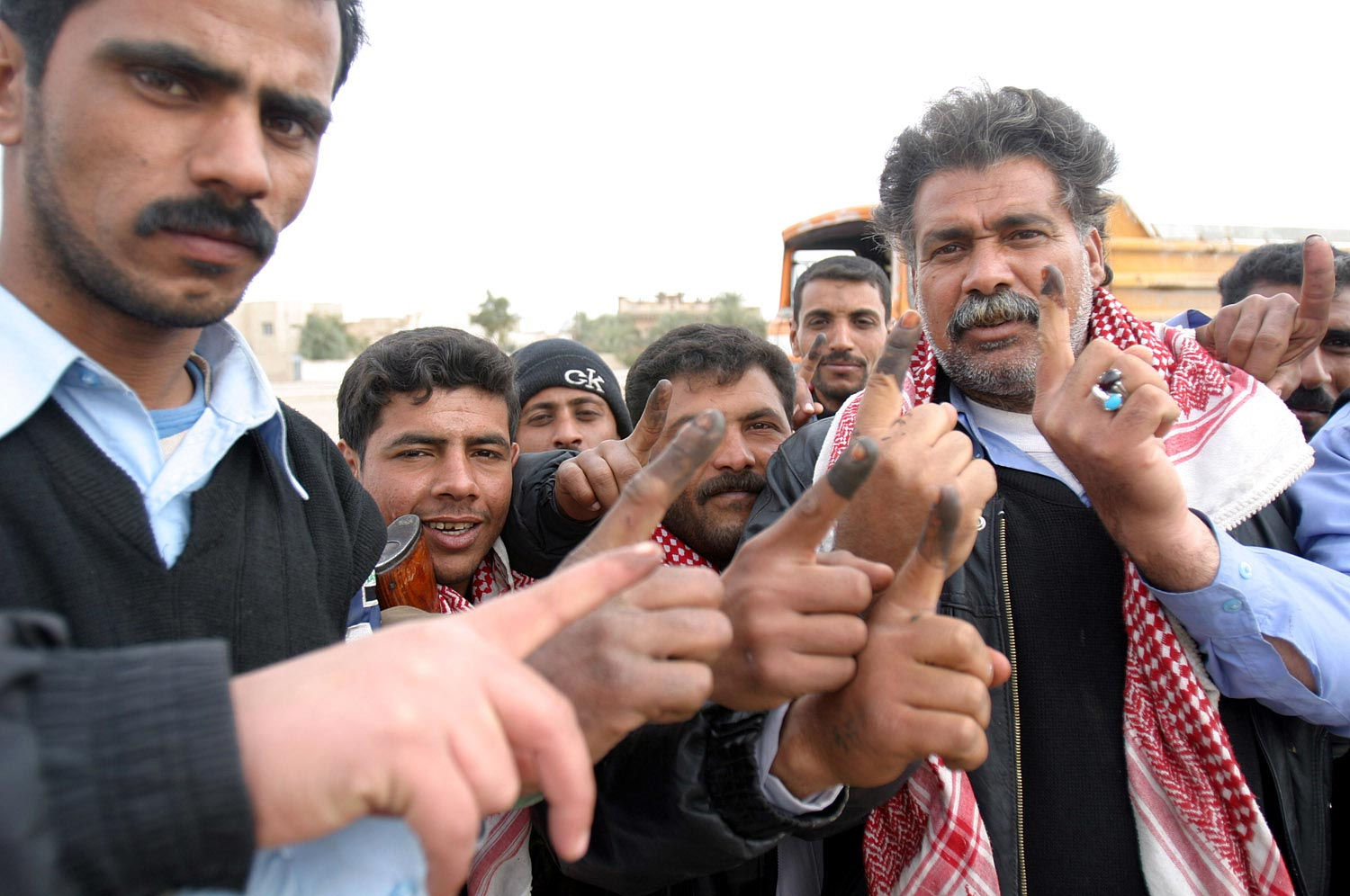
Voters in the 2005 Iraqi legislative election

Democracy promotion by the United States aimed to encourage governmental and non-governmental actors to pursue political reforms that will lead ultimately to democratic governance.

As the Middle East and North Africa (MENA) is an area of the world vital to American interests yet generally entrenched in non-democratic, authoritarian rule, it has been the subject of increasing interest on the part of the American government and democracy promoters, particularly after the terrorist attacks of September 11, 2001, with many viewing democratic transition as essential to regional stability and international security.

American efforts to promote democracy in the Middle East and North Africa were generally characterized by top-down and bottom-up democratization strategies, which can be pursued simultaneously. The former top-down approach involves putting rhetorical and diplomatic pressure on regimes to reform and could go so far as to involve direct American military engagement installing democratic government (as is the case in Iraq following the 2003 invasion). The U.S. government generally pursued the latter bottom-up approach by funding international organizations that help strengthen the bases for gradual democratic transition (the rule of law, accountable government institutions and expanded political competition) by offering technical assistance and training to political parties and electoral management bodies, engaging with civil society, producing assessments and polls, and promoting female political participation. Some have criticized American democracy promotion for ineffectiveness, a lack of consistency, taking a one-size-fits-all approach and using democracy to justify military intervention abroad. Moreover, it's said that US democracy promotion had been accompanied by heavy costs for the US and considerable damage to the target countries.

== Background: democracy as development ==
American promotion of democracy should be seen in the broader context of the international development field, in which there has been an increasing recognition of a relationship between governance and broad development challenges such as poverty. The United Nations Development Programme (UNDP) identifies democracy and governance (DG) as essential to achieving overall UN development objectives and the Millennium Development Goals, because DG work is part of "expanding capabilities and enlarging the choices people have of fulfilling their lives." The UNDP highlights three overall DG goals: fostering inclusive participation, strengthening responsive governing institutions, and basing democratic governance on international principles. The United States Agency for International Development (USAID) also places a priority on promoting democratic transition and good governance in accordance with overall U.S. foreign policy objectives.

Generally, DG work can be seen as taking two approaches: one views democratization as a political struggle between democrats and non-democrats and directs aid toward political processes and institutions such as elections, political parties, and civil society; and the second views democratization as a slower, longer-term process and directs aid at a wide range of political and socioeconomic sectors. In terms of implementation, donor country development agencies, such as USAID, UK Department for International Development (DFID) and the Canadian International Development Agency (CIDA), design and fund programs (according to donor country interests and local needs) that are often carried out by international non-governmental organizations (NGOs) in coordination with local and international groups.

=== MENA context ===
Although the definition of the "Middle East" is contested among international relations scholars, some have concluded that it encompasses an Arab core with a non-Arab periphery including Israel, Iran and Turkey. While others argue that the Arab states of North Africa "are better seen as their own, separate, regional system," the term "Middle East and North Africa" is used predominantly in American, international, and United Nations DG development literature to refer to this area of the world. In the context of the MENA region, the impetus to direct American democracy promotion through international non-governmental NGOs stems from suspicion of the motives of the U.S. government. Overall American DG priorities in MENA – including building accountable government institutions, promoting the rule of law, and expanding political competition – have been shaped in part by UN assessments of the region such as the Arab Human Development Report, installments of which have been released since 2002, in spite of American efforts generally to limit the UN's political role in the region. The UN Arab Human Development Report on freedom in the Arab world, which was written by Arab intellectuals and released in 2004, conceives of freedom and democratic governance as essential to development in Arab countries: "No Arab thinker today doubts that freedom is a vital and necessary condition, though not the only one, for a new Arab renaissance, or that the Arab world's capacity to face up to its internal and external challenges, depends on ending tyranny and securing fundamental rights and freedoms." The report envisions the role of the international community, and particularly the UN, as strengthening internally driven transformation by encouraging legal reforms that give civil society organizations freedom to operate and guaranteeing conditions to hold free and fair elections.

=== Rationale for external support ===
The rationale for outside support for democratization in the Middle East is outlined by Albrecht Schnabel, who says that the Middle East is a region with strong authoritarian regimes and weak civil society and identifies the democratization dilemma in the region as the following: a strong civil society is required to produce leaders and mobilize the public around democratic duties, but in order for such a civil society to flourish, a democratic environment and process allowing freedom of expression and order is required in the first place. "If domestic capacities are lacking, external support may be required. Externally supported creation of fragile, yet somewhat functioning institutions is meant to trigger the momentum needed to encourage the evolution of a functioning civil society. The latter will, after a few years of consolidation and post-conflict stability, produce the first wholly internally crafted government. At that time, external involvement, if still provided at that point, can cede." Schnabel argues that democratization in the Middle East must come from both below and above, given that pressure from below will be pointless if the political leadership is opposed to reform, while top-down reform (which has been the norm in the Middle East) is not a fruitful endeavor if the political culture in society is not developed.

Others challenge the assumption that civil society in the Arab world is weak, pointing to the flourishing of civil society activity visible when regimes permit a degree of liberalization, which in turn permits civil society to make further demands for political opening. Western donors should therefore not focus solely on creating demand for democracy on a societal level, but also on encouraging policy reform that would expand political competition by "putting a stop to legislative manipulation aimed at maintaining state and government control over NGOs" and "allowing a revival of politics in a society where a correct political life has been stifled by the state."

Still others assert that the conflation of promoting civil society and promoting democracy in development rhetoric is flawed. Whereas civil society is a tool for developing democracy, it is not democracy itself and indeed does not always result in democratic behavior or values.

=== American Public Support for Democracy Promotion ===
In general, public support for democracy promotion is low. Public opinion polls since the 1990s consistently show that only about a quarter of Americans support democracy promotion. Academic research further suggests that Americans are not persuaded to support international democracy promotion either to spread American values abroad or to promote US national interest.

== History of American democracy promotion ==
American foreign policy attitudes toward democracy promotion in the Middle East and North Africa have changed significantly from the twentieth to the twenty-first centuries, with the former largely dominated by nominal commitment to democratic change in the region and the latter witnessing intensified, even forceful, efforts at democratization.

=== Post-WWII ===
The notion of development emerged in the 1940s and 1950s out of the post-World War II context in which a new international economic order was established, the United States made contributions to European reconstruction, and attention to the post-colonial Third World increased. The United States included among its aims in World War I the defense of democracies, and after WWII attempted to institutionalize democratic systems in countries that had lost the war (such as Germany and Japan); meanwhile during the Cold War, democracy promotion was a distant goal, with security concerns and a centering of policy against Soviet expansion dominating. President Jimmy Carter applied limited diplomatic pressure, which resulted in a conservative backlash resistant to criticism of authoritarian allies, while President Reagan selectively supported anti-communist democratic transition in countries such as El Salvador, the Philippines, and South Korea.

In the MENA region, however, the United States did little to rupture relations with authoritarian regimes and largely avoided paying significant attention to human rights and democratization. Indeed, at times the United States found itself opposed to democratic governance in the MENA region when it conflicted with American interests – participating in the overthrow of a democratically elected government in Iran in 1953, for example, due to oil interests and alleged fear of any leftist move toward the Soviets.

=== Post-Soviet era ===
Toward the end of the Cold War, an American political consensus began to emerge suggesting that democratic transition should be actively supported – a consensus only more firmly established following the dissolution of the Soviet Union when the United States found itself in less of a difficult position balancing security concerns and promotion of its ideals. This was based in part on democratic peace theory, which added a security element to democracy promotion. The Middle East was not excluded from this discussion, with some calling for increased American democracy promotion as a means of encouraging more peaceful relations with Israel and moderating extremists, while not going so far as to destabilize friendly autocratic regimes. The assumption that a positive relationship exists between democratic governance and peace which was prominent in the 1990s faced some inconsistency in the Middle East, however, because regimes that engaged to some extent in the peace process with Israel (and in the case of Jordan successfully reached a peace agreement) at the same time slowly and half-heartedly pursued democratization and allowed little opening to opposition movements who resisted negotiation with Israel.

Traditional promotion of free market economics also spurred new calls for democratization in the MENA region. The first democracy aid programs in the Arab world, including the creation of a modest $3 million Middle East Democracy Fund, were introduced by the George H. W. Bush administration as a means of encouraging economic liberalization via political liberalization, though the projects were primarily focused on improving management and efficiency in government institutions, as opposed to addressing contentious issues such as human rights abuses, government structures preserving authoritarian power, and laws and practices suppressive of democracy. While the Clinton administration broke with the Reagan and Bush administrations in its willingness to work with civil society organizations and promote democratic transition beyond formerly Soviet countries, democracy promotion still remained a relatively low priority and Arab regimes were largely able to resist increased pressure from foreign-funded international NGOs in the 1990s. Nonetheless, the United States spent $250 million on democracy programs in the region from 1991 to 2001, and political reform appeared as a goal in State Department and USAID literature, even if it did not figure prominently in high-level diplomatic discussions.

=== September 11, 2001 and the George W. Bush administration ===
After the terrorist attacks of September 11, 2001, U.S. government officials questioned the lack of large-scale American democracy promotion mechanisms in the MENA region, viewing democracy as a means of promoting moderation and stability and preventing terrorism. This resulted in a ramping-up of diplomatic rhetoric on the necessity of democratization and political reform in the Middle East and an increase in funding for democracy promotion in the region. Spreading democracy was also one rationalization used by neo-conservatives and the Bush administration for undertaking the War in Iraq.

==== Bottom-up initiatives ====
The Bush administration initiated several large-scale DG projects, including the Middle East Partnership Initiative (MEPI) in 2002 and the Broader Middle East and North Africa Initiative (BMENA) in partnership with the Group of Eight in 2004. Different U.S.-funded projects focused on engaging civil society, political party training, and other "bottom-up" strategies, despite resistance on the part of regimes.

The emphasis on engagement with civil society was based in part on the belief that emerged after 9/11 that the absence of good governance allows "uncivil" society to thrive and frustrations that would be otherwise addressed non-violently in a democratic system show themselves in the form of terrorism.

==== Top-down diplomatic pressure ====
President Bush presented U.S. involvement in Iraq as an element of promoting democratization across the MENA region, and his "agenda for freedom" would entail not only more funding for democracy promotion projects, but increased pressure on Arab governments to liberalize.

In a speech at the American University in Cairo in July 2005, Secretary of State Condoleezza Rice claimed that American intervention in Iraq had resulted in millions of Iraqis resisting terror and participating in democracy, and she pointed to developments in Jordan, Syria, Lebanon, Iran, and Egypt as indicators of democracy's trajectory in the region. In one segment of her speech she outlined several aspects of the Bush administration's view of democratization in the region, including denying that democracy is being imposed from the outside, stressing that democracy would bring peace rather than chaos, pressing leaders in the region to commit to the democratization process, and asserting the incompatibility of terrorism and democracy:

"Throughout the Middle East, the fear of free choices can no longer justify the denial of liberty. It is time to abandon the excuses that are made to avoid the hard work of democracy. There are those who say that democracy is being imposed. It is tyranny that must be imposed. People choose democracy freely. And successful reform is always homegrown. Just look around the world today. For the first time in history, more people are citizens of democracies than of any other form of government. This is the result of choice, not of coercion. There are those who say that democracy leads to chaos, or conflict, or terror. In fact, the opposite is true: Freedom and democracy are the only ideas powerful enough to overcome hatred, and division, and violence. For people of diverse races and religions, the inclusive nature of democracy can lift the fear of difference that some believe is a license to kill. But people of goodwill must choose to embrace the challenge of listening, and debating, and cooperating with one another. For neighboring countries with turbulent histories, democracy can help to build trust and settle old disputes with dignity. But leaders of vision and character must commit themselves to the difficult work that nurtures the hope of peace. And for all citizens with grievances, democracy can be a path to lasting justice. But the democratic system cannot function if certain groups have one foot in the realm of politics and one foot in the camp of terror."

A significant democratic stirring in the MENA region ensued from 2004 to 2006, marked by demonstrations, open calls for reform, and enhanced activity on the part of pro-democracy activists, yet U.S. pressure on regimes to implement top-down political reform had declined significantly by mid-2006 following strong parliamentary gains by the Egyptian Muslim Brotherhood in 2005 elections and a Hamas victory in the 2006 Palestinian elections. This receding of U.S. diplomatic pressure was criticized by Arab pro-democracy advocates and was followed by an increase in authoritarian crackdowns on political opposition.

==== Criticism of the Bush administration ====
One criticism leveled at the Bush administration's democracy agenda is that short-term strategic and diplomatic imperatives such as cooperation on counter-terrorism, assistance in creating stability in Iraq, and support for the peace process ultimately trumped or diluted the push for reform. Other critics, such as retired general and former presidential candidate Wesley Clark, doubted the effectiveness of American military engagement as a tactic for democracy promotion given that reformers in the region "don't want to have their own hopes and dreams subordinated to the political agenda of the United States," and he attributed signs of progress in the MENA region to the National Endowment for Democracy and international organizations who "have been working with and strengthening reform-minded elements in these countries for years."

=== Obama administration ===
President Barack Obama attempted to make a distinction between his administration's stance on democracy promotion and that of his predecessors in his June 2009 speech in Cairo, claiming that "no system of government can or should be imposed upon one nation by any other," while still maintaining his commitment to "governments that reflect the will of the people." In his September 2010 address to the UN General Assembly, Obama expressed a commitment to engaging with civil society, yet said: "The ultimate success of democracy in the world won't come because the United States dictates it; it will come because individual citizens demand a say in how they are governed."

There is some indication that the Obama administration may be pursuing a new approach to development, one moving away from military-led development projects and toward a more independent USAID that will include in its new strategy an effort to reduce poor governance.

Some analysts stress that the Arab regimes have shown themselves to be increasingly intransigent with regards to reform in recent years, a trend that could require a re-evaluation of U.S. policy and strategy. Others suggest that the United States should more earnestly push for reforms, including electoral reform, judicial independence, and expansion of freedom of the press and civil society, as well as engage Islamist political actors.

== Effectiveness of military intervention ==
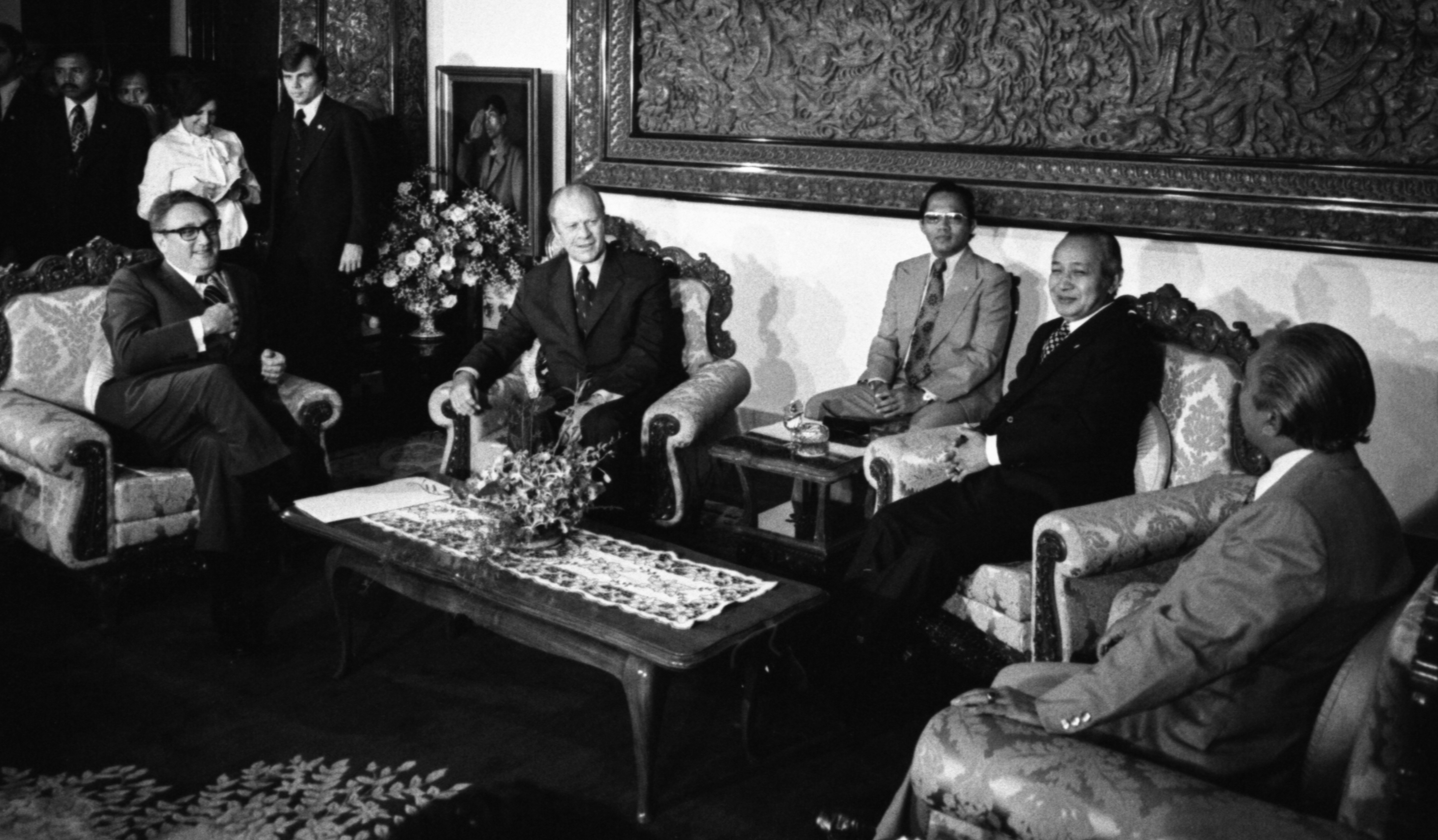
Indonesian President Suharto with U.S. President Gerald Ford in Jakarta on 6 December 1975, one day before the Indonesian invasion of East Timor

Studies have been devoted to the historical success rate of the U.S. in exporting democracy abroad. Some studies of American intervention have been pessimistic about the overall effectiveness of U.S. efforts to encourage democracy in foreign nations. Until recently, scholars have generally agreed with international relations professor Abraham Lowenthal that U.S. attempts to export democracy have been "negligible, often counterproductive, and only occasionally positive". Other studies find U.S. intervention has had mixed results, and another by Hermann and Kegley has found that military interventions have improved democracy in other countries.

=== Opinion that U.S. intervention does not export democracy ===
In United States history, critics have charged that presidents have used democracy to justify military intervention abroad. Critics have also charged that the U.S. helped local militaries overthrow democratically elected governments in Iran, Guatemala, and in other instances.

Professor Paul W. Drake argued that the U.S. first attempted to export democracy in Latin America through intervention from 1912 to 1932. Drake argued that this was contradictory because international law defines intervention as "dictatorial interference in the affairs of another state for the purpose of altering the condition of things". The study suggested that efforts to promote democracy failed because democracy needs to develop out of internal conditions, and can not be forcibly imposed. There was disagreement about what constituted democracy; Drake suggested American leaders sometimes defined democracy in a narrow sense of a nation having elections; Drake suggested a broader understanding was needed. Further, there was disagreement about what constituted a "rebellion"; Drake saw a pattern in which the U.S. State Department disapproved of any type of rebellion, even so-called "revolutions", and in some instances rebellions against dictatorships. Historian Walter LaFeber stated, "The world's leading revolutionary nation (the U.S.) in the eighteenth century became the leading protector of the status quo in the twentieth century."

Mesquita and Downs evaluated 35 U.S. interventions from 1945 to 2004 and concluded that in only one case, Colombia, did a "full fledged, stable democracy" develop within ten years following the intervention. Samia Amin Pei argued that nation building in developed countries usually unravelled four to six years after American intervention ended. Pei, based on study of a database on worldwide democracies called Polity, agreed with Mesquita and Downs that U.S. intervention efforts usually don't produce real democracies, and that most cases result in greater authoritarianism after ten years.

Professor Joshua Muravchik argued U.S. occupation was critical for Axis power democratization after World War II, but America's failure to encourage democracy in the third world "prove ... that U.S. military occupation is not a sufficient condition to make a country democratic". The success of democracy in former Axis countries such as Italy were seen as a result of high national per-capita income, although U.S. protection was seen as a key to stabilization and important for encouraging the transition to democracy. Steven Krasner agreed that there was a link between wealth and democracy; when per-capita incomes of $6,000 were achieved in a democracy, there was little chance of that country ever reverting to an autocracy, according to an analysis of his research in the Los Angeles Times.

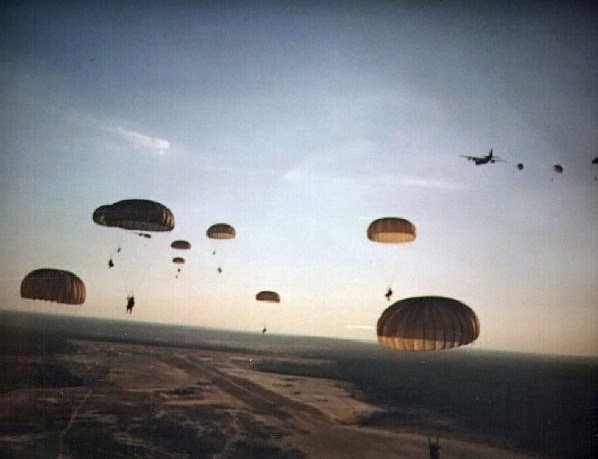
U.S. Army Rangers during the 1983 invasion of Grenada. The invasion established an interim government and democratic elections were held in 1984.

=== Opinion that U.S. intervention has mixed results ===
Tures examined 228 cases of American intervention from 1973 to 2005, using Freedom House data. A plurality of interventions, 96, caused no change in the country's democracy. In 69 instances, the country became less democratic after the intervention. In the remaining 63 cases, a country became more democratic. However this does not take into account the direction the country would have gone with no U.S. intervention.

=== Opinion that U.S. intervention effectively exports democracy ===
Hermann and Kegley said American military interventions designed to protect or promote democracy increased freedom in those countries, however Peceny argued that the democracies created after military intervention are still closer to an autocracy than a democracy, quoting Przeworski "while some democracies are more democratic than others, unless offices are contested, no regime should be considered democratic." Therefore, Peceny concludes, it is difficult to know from the Hermann and Kegley study whether U.S. intervention has only produced less repressive autocratic governments.

Peceny stated that the United States attempted to export democracy in 33 of its 93 20th-century military interventions.

== American DG priorities ==
American democracy promotion priorities are outlined in specific terms by U.S. government bodies tasked with funding projects, as well as government-established, private granting institutions. Among these are USAID, the Department of State Middle East Partnership Initiative (MEPI), and the National Endowment for Democracy (NED).

=== USAID ===
- Building democratic, accountable, and effective government through institutional reform and technical assistance and training;
- Promoting the rule of law;
- Expanding political competition by engaging civil society organizations, political parties, electoral administration stakeholders, the media, and local governments
- Help fund democratic groups inside of the country

=== MEPI ===
- Engaging civil society with the aim of "laying the groundwork for sustainable, locally driven political reform and democratic governance";
- Strengthening democratic processes by training political parties and candidates, enhancing the political participation of women and other disenfranchised groups, and supporting free and fair electoral processes;
- Promoting the rule of law by educating citizens on legal rights and working with governments to build better legal infrastructures;
- Building networks for civil activists

=== NED ===
- Encouraging women's political participation;
- Engaging civic groups focused on legislative advocacy, government accountability, and capacity building;
- Enhancing electoral processes;
- Promoting the rule of law;
- Supporting independent media

== Major American democracy promoting institutions ==
=== Government ===
- United States Agency for International Development (USAID)
- Department of State
  - Bureau of Democracy, Human Rights, and Labor (DRL)
  - Middle East Partnership Initiative (MEPI)

=== Government-funded private granting institutions ===
- National Endowment for Democracy (NED)
- Amideast
- U.S. Institute of Peace (USIP)

=== International non-governmental organizations ===
- International Foundation for Electoral Systems (IFES)
- International Republican Institute (IRI)
- National Democratic Institute (NDI)
- Democracy International (DI)
- Center for International Private Enterprise (CIPE)
- International Institute for Democracy and Electoral Assistance (International IDEA)
- International Relief and Development (IRD)
- American Bar Association Rule of Law Initiative (ABA)
- International Research and Exchanges Board (IREX)
- International Crisis Group (ICG)
- Ford Foundation
- Meridian International Center
- Chemonics (for-profit)
- Creative Associates (for-profit)
- Management Systems International (for-profit)
- DAI (for-profit)

=== Human rights NGOs ===
- Freedom House
- Human Rights Watch
- Human Rights First
- International Center for Transitional Justice (ICTJ)
- American Near East Refugee Aid (ANERA)
- Carter Center

=== Think tanks/academic-oriented institutions ===
- Project on Middle East Democracy (POMED)
- Washington Institute for Near East Policy (WINEP)
- Carnegie Endowment Middle East Program
- Brookings Saban Center for Middle East Policy
- EastWest Institute
- Foreign Policy Initiative
- American Enterprise Institute (AEI)
- Potomac Institute for Policy Studies
- American University Center for Democracy and Elections Management (CDEM)

== Financing ==
A report commissioned by USAID determined the following amounts of DG assistance allocated for countries in the MENA region between 1990 and 2004:

Algeria ($3.7 million in 8 years), Bahrain ($1.3 million in 2 years), Egypt ($334.3 million in 14 years), Iraq ($523.6 million in 3 years), Jordan ($28.3 million in 5 years), Lebanon ($28.5 million in 11 years), Morocco ($3.6 million in 7 years), Oman ($0.6 million in 2 years), Qatar ($0.8 million in 1 year), Saudi Arabia ($0.4 million in 1 year), Tunisia ($11.2 million in 5 years), Turkey ($0.9 million in 4 years), West Bank and Gaza ($155.4 million in 11 years), Yemen ($6.6 million in 8 years)

In 2017, The Economist reported that the Near East Regional Democracy programme had allocated about $30 million per year for promoting democracy and human rights in Iran.

== Challenges and criticism ==
American democracy promotion has been a highly analyzed and criticized component of both U.S. foreign policy and development strategies. Criticism focuses in general on the following challenges for American DG efforts: effectiveness, aid prioritization, selectivity, financing, and discourse and objectivity.

=== Effectiveness ===
Critical perspectives on U.S. democracy promotion often stress that praise heaped on projects funded by the American government tends to be exaggerated. This criticism is rooted in democracy and governance indicators that show illiberalism in the Arab world has actually increased in some cases, due in part to short-term stability considerations that trump top-down democracy promotion and the failure of bottom-up projects to address the ability of Arab regimes to act as "veto-players". Although American democracy promotion efforts in the MENA region take a more balanced top-down/bottom-up strategy than those of the European Union and engage in more politically sensitive areas such as state institution building, some question the assumption that pushing for liberalizing reforms is a worthwhile endeavor given that regimes can easily de-liberalize and reforms are often cosmetic and do not alter the real balance of effective governing power. Furthermore, promoting DG in the MENA region operating on the assumption that proper counsel and expert advice can guide a government to reform ignores the possibility that regimes are not necessarily "neutral apparatus representing public interests" and may be resistant to relinquishing power.

The more serious criticism of American DG work in the region is that it can lead to more harm than good. "Dishonest" democratization involving superficial political liberalization can serve as a facade for continued authoritarianism and repression of civil society, and even help reinforce and stabilize autocratic regimes. By praising disingenuous reforms, the United States runs the risk of further entrenching authoritarianism in the region.

By focusing on funding civil society organizations, foreign donors can create dependency "at the expense of building a domestic democratic movement" and open NGOs up to criticism from their compatriots, not least from the state, which can use foreign funding as justification for cracking down on activists and democracy proponents, such as Saad Eddin Ibrahim and Ayman Nour in Egypt. Furthermore, regimes have proven adept at co-opting and neutralizing many civil society organizations, which calls into question the assumption that support for civil society should "be equated with support for democratization, given that civil society has also played a role in normalizing authoritarianism in the postindependence period."

The same logic is applied to women's political participation. Heba Raouf Ezzat questions the utility of promoting women's involvement and normalization of authoritarian regimes: "In Egypt, Morocco, Bahrain, Qatar and other countries the official support of women as ministers or executives or even judges serves only to obscure the rising authoritarianism of the regimes that is veiled by soft democratic rhetoric limited to the vocal level or reduced to trivial changes that are curbed by logistic and legal details. No power-sharing is taking place and political elites are well determined to monopolize authority."

=== Aid prioritization: military v. DG ===
A second dilemma for U.S. democracy promotion is aid prioritization. Critics say the priorities of Western aid must be viewed as a whole, and therefore question the vastly greater amounts spent on military aid than democracy aid. Massive foreign aid to countries like Jordan and Egypt, for example, gives regimes the ability to both co-opt and repress their populations by supporting state job and economic infrastructures and funding state security apparatuses. This results in often contradictory U.S. positions on democracy, with officials praising Arab security structures that are used to crack down on activists and civil society while simultaneously funding technical assistance aimed at promoting democracy in Egypt and Palestine for example.

While some U.S. policymakers, including Condoleezza Rice, have linked democracy promotion to achieving peace and security, the relationship may not be so clear, some scholars maintain, given that a level of instability is inherent in the democratization process in the short-run, even if a politically reformed Middle East in the long-term could be an asset for international security.

=== Selectivity in engaging civil society ===
Another dilemma for democracy promotion projects aimed at engaging civil society is that they often end up selectively working with NGOs that are seen as non-threatening to regimes and not in opposition to the donor's policy in the region – thus largely ruling out work with Islamist civil society groups for U.S.–funded projects.

The possibility of an Islamist rise to power via democratic means (and potential opposition to Israel and/or overthrow of democracy in favor of Islamic government) is an enduring concern for American democracy promotion. It may also be a matter of U.S. credibility in the MENA region, where America was sharply criticized for seemingly applying a double standard in the 2006 Palestinian parliamentary elections – encouraging free and fair elections, only to withdraw aid and diplomatically boycott the new government when Hamas emerged the victor.

Some, such as Laurie Mylroie, suggest that democracy and Islamic tradition are incompatible, and illiberal Islamists may be worse than the current authoritarian regimes (although she suggests it may be useful for the United States to promote human rights and democracy in certain parts of the Middle East to oppose dictators such as Saddam Hussein). Others stress the compatibility of democracy and the Islamic notion of shura, or consultation, and say that Western and international donors should not hesitate to promote democracy as a means of encouraging Arab democrats and responsible governance practices.

While it may be impossible to come to a reliable conclusion on Islamist moderation through democratic participation while political freedom is absent, Amr Hamzawy and Nathan Brown point out that despite ambiguity on commitment to democracy, the political experience of Islamist movements across the Arab world suggest three rising trends: "respect for the institutional framework of the state in which they operate; acceptance of plurality as a legitimate mode of political existence; and a gradual retreat from ideological debates in favor of a growing concentration on pragmatic agendas that are primarily concerned with influencing public policies." Likewise, in their analysis of the Egyptian Muslim Brotherhood's parliamentary experience, Samer Shehata and Joshua Stacher point to the Brotherhood's reformist agenda and conclude that "the bloc's political practice—its proactive study of political issues and use of parliamentary procedure to hold the government's feet to the fire—has the potential to strengthen permanently the institution of Parliament vis-à-vis the executive led by President Husni Mubarak."

Larry Diamond lists American and European dialogue with moderate Islamists as key to democracy promotion, suggesting a bargain in which Western powers would press for Islamist parties' right to participate in free and fair elections in exchange for an unambiguous commitment to democracy and equal rights for women and religious minorities, in addition to recognition of Israel.

=== Financing an "industry" ===
The funding aspect of American democracy promotion leads some to question the "industry" that emerged as post-Soviet American politics led to increased democracy promotion and "older development-oriented companies and organizations quickly added democratization to their repertoire in order to expand their work and benefit from the new stream of funding." The emergence of a focus on governance as a means of promoting open markets had reverberations in the Middle East and North Africa. Critics of aid aimed at stimulating free market enterprise and thereby creating a middle class which would push for democracy assert that it can result in transforming local NGOs into a business sector framed as an example of entrepreneurship but dependent on aid from the West.

=== Discourse and objectivity ===
Although international development work has evolved in terms of its vision, the assumption that those offering assistance from the outside know how to best serve the interests and needs of people inside a country persists in the field, according to some, and is reflected in the Arab world in development rhetoric "rooted in a colonial discourse about native backwardness."

Polling data in the Arab world suggests that Arab public opinion largely rejects the assertion that U.S. democracy assistance is helpful. This skepticism of democracy promotion and view of aid as a form of domination is prevalent, according to some analysts, because of the perceived subjection of democracy support to American interests in the region. Noam Chomsky argues that "U.S. democratic rhetoric and undemocratic substance have a long history," and the United States only supports democracy "if and only if it conforms to U.S. economic and strategic objectives."

Such power dynamics associated with democracy discourse can be influential. Walid Kazziha argues that despite the fact that Arab intellectual debate on democracy had been lively in the twentieth century and home-grown demands for political opening had been placed on regimes, Western discourse on democracy grew in influence in the region from the 1980s onwards, and by the beginning of the 21st century, the "Arab drive for democratization, which emerged after the 1967 Arab defeat, had been diverted from its national course, due to the intervention of the West." Likewise, Sari Hanafi's analysis of the relationship between international donors and Palestinian NGOs reveals that an increasingly globalized Palestinian elite heading NGOs "perceive and internalize the donor agenda not only as global but also as universal and self-evident."

Indeed, development discourse and the categories it creates can have severe power implications, in the view of some scholars, who say such discourse is an extension of the "coercive power of Western-dominated global institutions." In his analysis of the American offer of technical aid to develop Egypt's largely agrarian economy after World War II, Timothy Mitchell analyzes USAID rhetoric, pointing to the "model answers" that supposedly objective experts bring to Egypt. What is often ignored in the discussion of a development scheme based on providing technical knowledge, Mitchell argues, is that an organization like USAID is hardly "a rational consciousness standing outside the country" as it imagines itself to be, but "is in fact a central element in configurations of power within the country." According to Mitchell, the projects USAID pursues are built on a discourse subservient to American political and economic interests and can potentially do more harm than good for Egyptians. He maintains that democracy rhetoric is also employed according to American-defined categories such as promoting economic liberalization, citing a 1989 USAID report's calls for political decentralization and encouraging "democracy and pluralism" as a means of empowering rural landlords who would support free market economy at the expense of local peasants.

Some critics have also argued that the U.S. has used democracy to justify military intervention abroad.

== See also ==
- Criticism of the United States government
- Foreign policy of the United States
- United States foreign policy in the Middle East
