= Gray space =

Theoretical concept in urban geography

Gray space is a theoretical concept that explains the causes and consequences of a rapid expansion in informal and temporary urban development, widely prevalent in contemporary city regions. It argues that the rise of informality reflects a significant transformation of urban regime and citizenship. The concept was formulated by geographer and urbanist Oren Yiftachel, who noted that through a process of 'gray spacing', urban society is increasingly being governed under frameworks of 'separate and unequal', spawning greater uneven fragmentation, conflict and ethno-class stratification. Urban and planning theorists are thus challenged by this theory to reinvent equal and just forms of belonging and resources allocation in the increasingly informal city.

In geography, land use planning, and epidemiology, the term 'grey space' (note the spelling with e) is used to refer to urban land covers that are not green, as an antonym of urban green space. Recent work in Leisure Studies has sought to define this urban "grey space" as a material and symbolic feature of outdoor leisure pursuits, like skateboarding.

== Definition ==
Gray spaces include fluctuating assemblages of developments, lands, populations and transactions, positioned between the ‘lightness’ of legality/approval/safety and the ‘darkness’ of eviction/destruction/death. Gray spaces are neither fully integrated nor eliminated, forming pseudo-permanent margins of today's urban regions.

Gray spacing differs from mere 'urban informality' by highlighting the systemic nature of this phenomenon, with long-term urban and political structural effects. Gray spacing has become a common policy response and control strategy towards peripheral groups, treating them as a 'state of exception' and condemning them to urban existence in 'indefinite temporariness', under a constant shadow of state criminalization, violence and possible displacement. This has concrete consequences for urban citizenship and regimes, as the unrecognized parts of the city, are continuously denied full access to their urban rights. Given the scale of urban growth and migration, and the rapidly growing portions of 'gray' populations and areas, urban citizenship increasingly resembles a system of 'separate and unequal' in many contemporary metropolitan regions.

The nature of gray spacing depends on power and privilege. The theory creates a continuum, between poles of gray spacing 'from below' and 'from above'. The former alludes to the encroachment of peripheral populations into urban space through migration, squatting, auto-construction and undocumented employment. They often remain unrecognized for lengthy periods as an elite response to the existence of growing numbers of 'unwanted, irremovable' groups in the city.

On the other hand, as public policy scholar Erez Tzfadia shows, Gray spacing 'from above' refers to encroachment beyond the law and the plan by privileged groups often under quiet approval of the state. Such developments are commonly 'laundered' into recognition and legality over time.
