= Terms for Palestinian citizens of Israel =

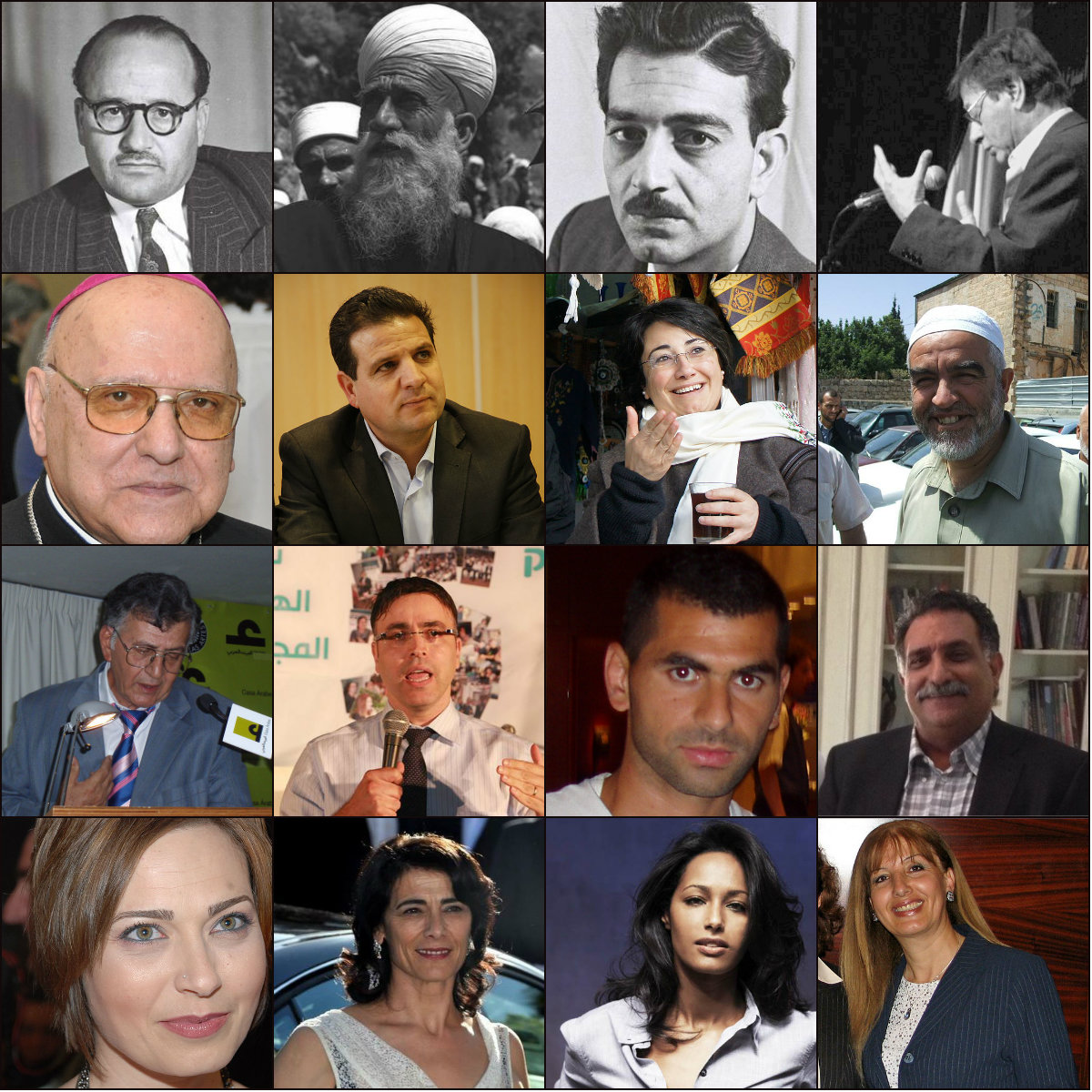
Arab citizens of Israel

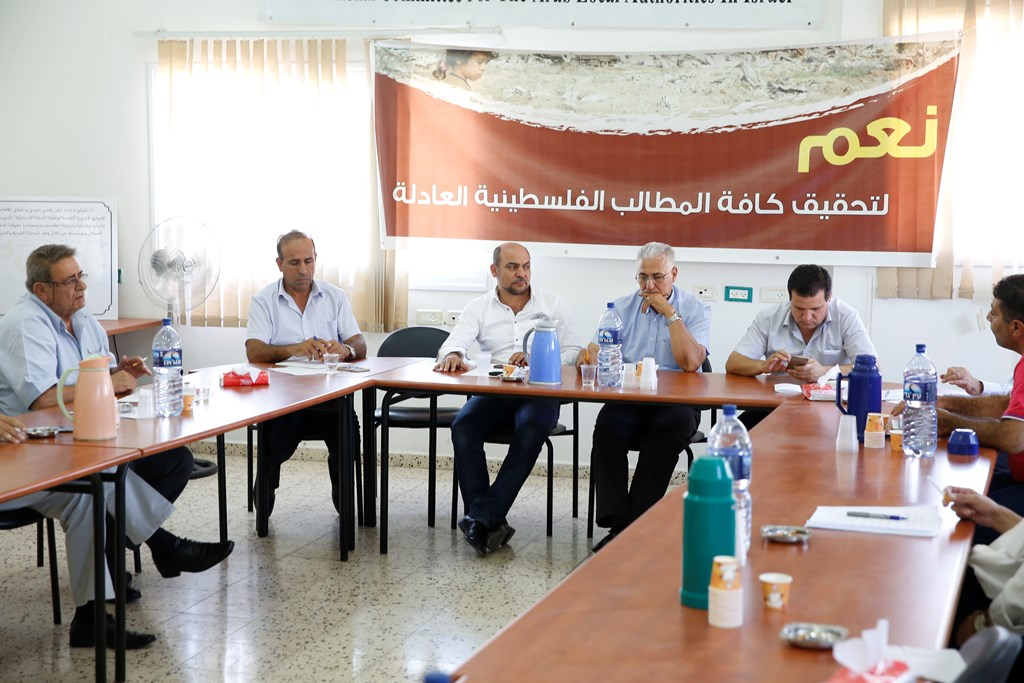
High Follow-Up Committee for Arab Citizens of Israel

The choice of terms for Palestinian citizens of Israel is a highly politicized issue, and there is a broad range of labels that members of this community use to self-identity. Generally speaking, supporters of Israel tend to use Israeli Arab or Arab Israeli to refer to this population without mentioning Palestine, while critics of Israel (or supporters of Palestinians) tend to use Palestinian or Palestinian Arab without referencing Israel. According to The New York Times, most preferred to identify themselves as Palestinian citizens of Israel rather than as Israeli Arabs, as of 2012. The New York Times uses both 'Palestinian Israelis' and 'Israeli Arabs' to refer to the same population.

The relationship of Arab citizens to the State of Israel is often fraught with tension and can be regarded in the context of relations between minority populations and state authorities elsewhere in the world. Arab citizens consider themselves to be an indigenous people. The tension between their Palestinian Arab national identity and their identity as citizens of Israel was famously described by an Arab public figure as: "My state is at war with my nation".

== List of terms ==
Arab/Palestinian citizens of Israel may refer to themselves by a wide range of terms. Each of these names, while referring to the same group of people, connotes a different balance in what is often a multilayered identity assigning varying levels of priority or emphasis to the various dimensions which may be historic-geographic ("Palestine (region)"), "national" or ethnoreligious (Palestinian, Arab, Israeli, Druze, Circassian), linguistic (Arabic-speaking), civic (feeling "Israeli" or not), etc.:

- Palestinian citizens of Israel is a term that most Arab citizens of Israel prefer to refer to themselves, and which some media (BBC, The New York Times, The Washington Post, NBC News) and other organizations use to refer to Israeli Arabs, either consistently or alternating the use of other terms for Israeli Arabs.
- Palestinian Arabs
- Palestinian Arabs in Israel
- Palestinian Israelis
- Palestinians in Israel
- Israeli Arabs
- Israeli Palestinian Arabs
- Israeli Palestinians
- Arab citizens of Israel
- Arab Israelis
- 48ers, '48 Arabs

Two appellations, among others listed above, are not applied to the East Jerusalem Arab population or the Druze in the Golan Heights, as these territories were occupied by Israel in 1967:

- the Arabs inside the Green Line
- the Arabs within (Arabic: عرب الداخل, romanized: 'Arab al-Dākhil).

== Self-identification ==
According to The New York Times, as of 2012, most Israeli Arabs preferred to identify themselves as Palestinian citizens of Israel rather than as Israeli Arabs. The Council on Foreign Relations also states that most members of the Israeli Arab community prefer this term. The Washington Post asserted in 2021 that "surveys showed" that Israeli Arabs preferred the term "Palestinian citizen of Israel" and that "for people who often feel caught between two worlds, however, the contours of what it means to be a Palestinian citizen of Israel remain a work in progress."

However, a 2017 Tel Aviv University poll reported that 40.8% of the group identify as "Arab citizen of Israel" or "Arab in Israel".

Similar terms that Israeli Arabs, media and other organizations may use are Palestinian Arabs in Israel and Israeli Palestinian Arabs. Amnesty reports that "Arab citizens of Israel" is an inclusive term used by Israel that describes a number of different and primarily Arabic-speaking groups, including Muslim Arabs, Christian Arabs, Druze and Circassians. At the end of 2019, considering the number of those defined as Muslim Arabs and Christian Arabs together, the population of Palestinian citizens of Israel amounted to around 1.8 million.

There are at least two terms which specifically exclude the East Jerusalem Arab population and the Druze and other Arabs in the Golan Heights: the Arabs inside the Green Line, and the Arabs within (Arabic: عرب الداخل, romanized: 'Arab al-Dākhil). These terms clarify that

- Although Israel annexed East Jerusalem in 1967, the vast majority of its Arab population does not have Israeli citizenship
- Although Israel annexed the Golan Heights, that area was originally part of Syria, not Mandatory Palestine.

=== As Palestinian ===
While known officially by the Israeli government only as "Israeli Arabs" or "Arab Israelis", the development of Palestinian nationalism and identity in the 20th and 21st centuries has been met by a marked evolution in self-identification, reflecting a rising identification with Palestinian identity alongside Arab and Israeli signifiers. Many Palestinian citizens of Israel have family ties to Palestinians in the West Bank and Gaza Strip as well as to Palestinian refugees in Jordan, Syria and Lebanon.

Between 1948 and 1967, very few Arab citizens of Israel identified openly as "Palestinian", and an "Israeli-Arab" identity, the preferred phrase of the Israeli establishment and public, was predominant. Public expressions of Palestinian identity, such as displays of the Palestinian flag or the singing and reciting of nationalist songs or poetry were illegal. With the end of military administrative rule in 1966 and following the 1967 war, national consciousness and its expression among Israel's Arab citizens spread. A majority then self-identified as Palestinian, preferring this descriptor to Israeli Arab in numerous surveys over the years. In a 2017 telephone poll, 40% of Arab citizens of Israel identified as "Arab in Israel / Arab citizen of Israel", 15% identified as "Palestinian", 8.9% as "Palestinian in Israel / Palestinian citizen of Israel", and 8.7% as "Arab"; the focus groups associated with the poll provided a different outcome, in which "there was consensus that Palestinian identity occupies a central place in their consciousness". A November 2023 poll asked respondents from this demographic what the most important "component in their personal identity" was to them; 33 percent answered "Israeli citizenship", 32 percent "Arab identity", 23 percent "religious affiliation", and 8 percent "Palestinian identity".

==== Druze and Circassians as Palestinian ====
In the Amnesty International 2022 report "Israel's Apartheid against Palestinians: Cruel System of Domination and Crime against Humanity", the organization excludes the Israeli Arab Druze and Circassians from the term Palestinian Arab citizens of Israel:

- The Israeli Ministry of Foreign Affairs officially classifies the roughly 2.1 million Palestinian citizens of Israel as "Arab citizens of Israel", reflecting their attributing a racialized non-Jewish, Arab status to all of them
- The term "Arab citizens of Israel" includes Muslim Arabs including Bedouins, Christian Arabs, the 20–25,000 Druze, and even the 4–5,000 Circassians, whose origins are in the Caucasus but are mostly Muslim.
- According to Amnesty, the Israeli state views and treats Palestinian citizens of Israel differently from the Druze and Circassians, who must for example serve in the army while Palestinian citizens need not serve.
- Nonetheless, Israeli authorities and media refer to those who self-identify as Palestinians – as "Israeli Arabs".

The Washington Post included the Druze among the Palestinians. The Council of Foreign Relations stated:"The majority of Arab citizens are Sunni Muslims, though there are many Christians and also Druze, who more often embrace Israeli identity."

=== As Arab Israeli ===
The question of Palestinian identity extends to representation in the Israeli Knesset. Journalist Ruth Margalit says of Mansour Abbas of the United Arab List, a member of the governing coalition, "The traditional term for this group, Arab Israelis, is increasingly controversial, but it's the one that Abbas prefers." Abbas gave an interview to Israeli media in November 2021 and said "My rights don't just come from my citizenship. My rights also come from being a member of the Palestinian people, a son of this Palestinian homeland. And whether we like it or not, the State of Israel, with its identity, was established inside the Palestinian homeland," Sami Abu Shehadeh of Balad is "an outspoken advocate of Palestinian identity". He says, referring to the 2021 Israel–Palestine crisis, "... If the past weeks provided lessons for the international community, then a main one is that they cannot continue to ignore the Palestinian citizens of Israel. Any solution should include full equality for all citizens as well as the respect and recognition of our rights as a national minority."

Some media using the term "Palestinian citizens of Israel" or "Palestinians in Israel" have treated the terms as interchangeable with "Arab citizens of Israel" or "Israeli Arabs", and have not discussed whether Druze and Circassians are exceptions. such as The New York Times.

== Israeli surveys ==
In 2017 the Konrad Adenauer Foundation's Program for Jewish-Arab Cooperation at the Moshe Dayan Center for Middle Eastern and African Studies at Tel Aviv University conducted a telephone poll, in which the results were:

- National identity with Israeli civil component 49.7%, of which
  - Palestinian (citizen) of Israel 8.9%
  - Arab (citizen) of Israel 40.8%
- Pure national identity 24.1%, of which
  - Palestinian 15.4%
  - Arab 8.7%
- Civil identity: Israeli 11.4%
- Religious identity 9.5%
- Other / Don't know 5.3%

The focus groups associated with the poll provided a different outcome, in which "there was consensus that Palestinian identity occupies a central place in their consciousness". reflecting "the strength of Palestinian-Arab identity", and that they do not see a contradiction between that and Israeli civic identity. The focus group revealed strong opposition to the term "Israeli-Arab" and to the concept of Israel's "Independence Day". The study concluded that the focus group findings of strong Palestinian national identity, not conflicting with Israeli civic identity, match those seen in the public sphere.

According to a 2019 survey by University of Haifa professor Sammy Smooha, conducted in Arabic among 718 Arab adults, 47% of the Arab population chose Palestinian identities with an Israeli component ("Israeli Palestinian", "Palestinian in Israel", "Palestinian Arab in Israel"), 36% prefers Israeli Arab identities without a Palestinian component ("Israeli", "Arab", "Arab in Israel", "Israeli Arab"), and 15% chose Palestinian identities without an Israeli component ("Palestinian", "Palestinian Arab"). When these two components are presented as competitors, 69% chose exclusive or primary Palestinian identity, compared with 30% who chose exclusive or primary Israeli Arab identity. 66% of the Arab population agreed that "the identity of 'Palestinian Arab in Israel' is appropriate to most Arabs in Israel."

== Academic practice ==
Common practice in contemporary academic literature is to identify this community as Palestinian as it is how the majority self-identify (See Self-Identification below for more). Terms preferred by most Arab citizens to identify themselves include Palestinians, Palestinians in Israel, Israeli Palestinians, the Palestinians of 1948, Palestinian Arabs, Palestinian Arab citizens of Israel or Palestinian citizens of Israel. There are, however, individuals from among the Arab citizenry who reject the term Palestinian altogether. A minority of Israel's Arab citizens include "Israeli" in some way in their self-identifying label; the majority identify as Palestinian by nationality and Israeli by citizenship.

== Historical development ==
Between 1920 and 1948, in what was then Mandatory Palestine, all citizens were known as Palestinians, and the two primary communities were referred to by the British authorities as "Arabs" and "Jews". Between 1948 and 1967, very few citizens of Israel identified openly as "Palestinian". An "Israeli-Arab" identity, the preferred phrase of the Israeli establishment and public, was predominant. Public expressions of Palestinian identity, such as displays of the Palestinian flag or the singing and reciting of nationalist songs or poetry were illegal. Ever since the 1948 Nakba, the Palestinians that have remained within the 1949 Armistice borders have been colloquially known as "48 Arabs" (Arabic: عرب ٤٨, romanized: ʿArab Thamāniya wa-ʾArbaʿīn). With the end of military administrative rule in 1966 and following the 1967 war, national consciousness and its expression among Israel's Arab citizens spread. A majority then self-identified as Palestinian, preferring this descriptor to Israeli Arab in numerous surveys over the years.

== Special cases: East Jerusalem and Golan Heights ==
Arabs in East Jerusalem and the Golan Heights (Syrian Golan) are special cases regarding citizenship and identity.

Arabs living in East Jerusalem, occupied and administered by Israel since the Six-Day War of 1967 hold Israeli ID cards, but most are non-citizen permanent residents since few accepted Israel's offer of citizenship after the war's end, refusing to recognize its sovereignty, and most maintain close ties with the West Bank. As permanent residents, they are eligible to vote in Jerusalem's municipal elections, although only a small percentage takes advantage of this right.

The Golan Heights was not part of Mandatory Palestine or the Ottoman political units which preceded it, but rather was part of Syria, and the UN still recognizes it as such, and calls it the Syrian Golan. The remaining Druze population of the Golan Heights, occupied and administered by Israel in 1967, are considered permanent residents under Israel's Golan Heights Law of 1981. Few have accepted full Israeli citizenship and the vast majority consider themselves citizens of Syria.
