= Ethnocracy =

Form of government controlled by a single ethnic group

An ethnocracy, also known as an ethnostate, is a type of political structure featuring "rule by a particular ethnos in a multi-ethnic situation". Ethnocracies may involve a state apparatus controlled by a dominant ethnic group (or groups) to further that group's perceived interests, power, dominance, and resources. Ethnocratic regimes in the modern era typically display a 'thin' democratic façade covering a more profound ethnic structure, in which ethnicity (race, religion, language, etc.) — and not citizenship — is the key to securing power and resources. An ethnocratic society facilitates the ethnicization of the state by the dominant group, through the expansion of control likely accompanied by conflict with minorities or neighbouring states.

The Israeli critical geographer Oren Yiftachel introduced the theory of ethnocratic regimes in 1997.

== Characteristics, structure, and dynamics ==
In the 20th century, a few states passed (or attempted to pass) nationality laws through efforts that share certain similarities. All took place in countries with at least one national minority that sought full equality in the state or in a territory that had become part of the state and in which it had lived for generations. Nationality laws were passed in societies that felt threatened by these minorities' aspirations of integration and demands for equality, resulting in regimes that turned xenophobia into major tropes. These laws were grounded in one ethnic identity, defined in contrast to the identity of the other, leading to persecution of and codified discrimination against minorities.

Research shows that several spheres of control are vital for ethnocratic regimes, including the armed forces, police, land administration, immigration, and economic development. These powerful government instruments may ensure domination by the leading ethnic groups and the stratification of society into "ethnoclasses" (exacerbated by 20th century capitalism's typically neo-liberal policies). Ethnocracies often manage to contain ethnic conflict in the short term by effective control over minorities and by effectively using the 'thin' procedural democratic façade. However, they tend to become unstable in the longer term, suffering from repeated conflict and crisis, which are resolved by either substantive democratization, partition, or regime devolution into consociational arrangements. Alternatively, ethnocracies that do not resolve their internal conflict may deteriorate into periods of long-term internal strife and the institutionalization of structural discrimination (such as apartheid).

In ethnocratic states, the government is typically representative of a particular ethnic group, which holds a disproportionately large number of posts. The dominant ethnic group (or groups) uses them to advance the position of their particular ethnic group(s) to the detriment of others. Other ethnic groups are systematically discriminated against and may face repression or violations of their human rights at the hands of state organs. Ethnocracy can also be a political regime instituted on the basis of qualified rights to citizenship, with ethnic affiliation (defined in terms of race, descent, religion, or language) as the distinguishing principle. Generally, the raison d'être of an ethnocratic government is to secure the most important instruments of state power in the hands of a specific ethnic collectivity. All other considerations concerning the distribution of power are ultimately subordinated to this basic intention.

Ethnocracies are characterized by their control system – the legal, institutional, and physical instruments of power deemed necessary to secure ethnic dominance. The degree of system discrimination will tend to vary greatly from case to case and from situation to situation. If the dominant group, whose interests the system is meant to serve and whose identity it is meant to represent, constitutes a small minority (typically 20% or less) of the population within the state territory, substantial institutionalized suppression will probably be necessary to sustain its control.

=== Means of avoiding ethnocracy ===
One view is that the most effective means of eliminating ethnic discrimination vary depending on the specific situation. In the Caribbean, a "rainbow nationalism" type of non-ethnic, inclusive civic nationalism has been developed as a way to eliminate ethnic power hierarchies over time. (Although Creole peoples are central in the Caribbean, Eric Kauffman warns against conflating the presence of a dominant ethnicity in such countries with ethnic nationalism.)

Andreas Wimmler notes that a non-ethnic federal system without minority rights has helped Switzerland to avoid ethnocracy but that this did not help in overcoming ethnic discrimination when introduced in Bolivia. Likewise, ethnic federalism "produced benign results in India and Canada" but did not work in Nigeria and Ethiopia. Edward E. Telles notes that anti-discrimination legislation may not work as well in Brazil as in the U.S. at addressing ethnoracial inequalities, since much of the discrimination that occurs in Brazil is class-based, and Brazilian judges and police often ignore laws that are intended to benefit non-elites.

== Mono-ethnocracy vs. poly-ethnocracy ==
In October 2012, Lise Morjé Howard introduced the terms mono-ethnocracy and poly-ethnocracy. Mono-ethnocracy is a type of regime where one ethnic group dominates, which conforms with the traditional understanding of ethnocracy. Poly-ethnocracy is a type of regime where more than one ethnic group governs the state. Both mono- and poly-ethnocracy are types of ethnocracy. Ethnocracy is founded on the assumptions that ethnic groups are primordial, ethnicity is the basis of political identity, and citizens rarely sustain multiple ethnic identities.

== Applicability of the term ==
=== Current ===
==== Belgium ====
Lise Morjé Howard has labeled Belgium as both a poly-ethnocracy and a democracy. Citizens in Belgium exercise political rights found in democracies, such as voting and free speech. However, Belgian politics is increasingly defined by ethnic divisions between the Flemish and Francophone communities. For example, all but one of the major political parties are formed around either a Flemish or Francophone identity.

==== Bosnia and Herzegovina ====
Bosnia and Herzegovina has been described as an ethnocracy by multiple scholars. Under the Dayton Agreement, the three-member Presidency and all 15 seats in the House of Peoples are allocated to members of the three "constituent peoples": Bosniaks, Croats, and Serbs. Ethnic minorities, such as Roma and Jews, are unable to hold these positions, which was the topic of the landmark 2009 ruling in Sejdić and Finci v. Bosnia and Herzegovina.

==== Israel ====
Israel has been described an ethnocracy by scholars such as Alexandre Kedar, Shlomo Sand, Oren Yiftachel, Asaad Ghanem, Haim Yakobi, Nur Masalha and Hannah Naveh.

However, some Israeli scholars such as Gershon Shafir, Yoav Peled and Sammy Smooha prefer the term ethnic democracy to describe Israel, which is intended to represent a "middle ground" between an ethnocracy and a liberal democracy. Smooha in particular argues that ethnocratic democracies, allowing a privileged status to a dominant ethnic majority while ensuring that all individuals have equal rights, are defensible. His opponents reply that insofar as Israel contravenes equality in practice, the term 'democratic' in his equation is flawed.

The Israeli Declaration of Independence includes specific language that provides equal rights to all of the inhabitants of the country.

"THE STATE OF ISRAEL will be open for Jewish immigration and for the Ingathering of the Exiles; it will foster the development of the country for the benefit of all its inhabitants; it will be based on freedom, justice and peace as envisaged by the prophets of Israel; it will ensure complete equality of social and political rights to all its inhabitants irrespective of religion, race or sex; it will guarantee freedom of religion, conscience, language, education and culture; it will safeguard the Holy Places of all religions; and it will be faithful to the principles of the Charter of the United Nations."

In 2018, Israel passed the Nation-State Bill which declared that "The right to exercise national self-determination in the State of Israel is unique to the Jewish people." The law also changed the status of Arabic, from an official language to a language with a special status, with Hebrew remaining the sole official language of Israel.

==== Lebanon ====
Lebanon has been described as ethnocratic due to key government positions being reserved to members of certain ethnicities; the presidency is reserved for Maronite Christians, the prime ministership for Sunni Muslim, and the parliamentary speakership for Shia Muslims. Ethnic minorities, such as Armenians and Syriac Catholics, are ineligible for these positions. The 1989 Taif Agreement allots fifty percent of parliamentary seats to Christians and fifty percent to Muslims.

==== Malaysia ====
Malaysia has been labeled as a pro-Bumiputera/Malay ethnocracy by various academics due to the Article 153 of the Constitution of Malaysia, as well as the Ketuanan Melayu (Malay supremacy) ideology, which gives them more economic, political and social rights over the Malaysian minorities such as the Malaysian Chinese and Malaysian Indians, who are treated as de facto second-class citizens.

==== Rwanda ====
According to academic Alana Tiemessen in 2004, Rwanda's president Paul Kagame and his Rwandan Patriotic Front political party have "been characterised inside and outside of Rwanda as a militarised ethnocracy that propagates the survival of Tutsis over the well-being of Hutus". In 2024, The New York Times noted that critics contended that members of the Tutsi ethnic group "dominate[d] the top echelons" of Rwanda's government under Kagame, thereby excluding Hutus and their 85% of the country's population. Prior to the 1990–1994 Rwanda Civil War and 1994 Rwandan genocide, Rwanda had been ruled by a Hutu ethnocracy since 1959.

==== Turkey ====
Turkey is described as an ethnocracy by multiple scholars. Nationalism has functioned as a dominant ideological framework in Turkey, enabling the marginalization of three officially recognized non-Muslim minorities—the Greeks, Armenians, and Jews—as well as the assimilation, colonial subjugation, and at times ethnic cleansing of non-Turkish Muslim groups.

According to Article 66 of the Turkish Constitution, "everyone bound to the Turkish state through the bond of citizenship is a Turk." According to the constitution, there are no minority rights since all citizens are Turks. This constitutional article ignores ethnic and religious minority rights. Although the Treaty of Lausanne guarantees some rights to non-Muslim minorities, in practice Turkey recognizes only Armenians, Greeks and Jews as minorities and excludes other non-Muslim groups.

Bilge Azgın points to government policies whose goals are the "exclusion, marginalization, or assimilation" of minority groups that are non-Turkish as the defining elements of Turkish ethnocracy. Jack Fong describes Turkey's policy of referring to its Kurdish minority as "mountain Turks" and its refusal to acknowledge any separate Kurdish identity as elements of the Turkish ethnocracy.

=== Historic ===
==== South Africa ====
From 1948 until 1994, South Africa had institutionalized a highly ethnocratic state structure, apartheid. In his 1985 book Power-Sharing in South Africa, Arend Lijphart classified contemporaneous constitutional proposals to address the resulting conflict into four categories:

- majoritarian (one man, one vote)
- non-democratic (varieties of white domination)
- partitionist (creating new political entities)
- consociational (power-sharing by proportional representation and elite accommodation)

These illustrate the idea that state power can be distributed along two dimensions: legal-institutional and territorial. Along the legal-institutional dimension are singularism (power centralised according to membership in a specific group), pluralism (power distribution among defined groups according to relative numerical strength), and universalism (power distribution without any group-specific qualifications). On the territorial dimension are the unitary state, "intermediate restructuring" (within one formal sovereignty), and partition (creating separate political entities). Lijphart had argued strongly in favour of the consociational model.

==== Northern Ireland ====
Northern Ireland has been described as an ethnocracy by numerous scholars. Wendy Pullan describes gerrymandering of electoral districts to ensure Unionist domination and informal policies that led to the police force being overwhelmingly Protestant as features of the Unionist ethnocracy. Other elements included discriminatory housing and policies designed to encourage Catholic emigration. Ian Shuttleworth, Myles Gould and Paul Barr agree that the systematic bias against Catholics and Irish nationalists fit the criteria for describing Northern Ireland as an ethnocracy from the time of the partition of Ireland until at least 1972, but argue that after the suspension of the Stormont Parliament, and even more so after the Good Friday Agreement in 1998, ethnocracy was weakened, and that Northern Ireland cannot be plausibly described as an ethnocracy today.

==== Uganda ====
Uganda under dictator Idi Amin Dada has been described as an ethnocracy favouring certain indigenous groups over others, as well as for the ethnic cleansing of Indians in Uganda by Amin.

== See also ==
- Dominant minority
- Ethnic democracy
- Ethnic nationalism
- Herrenvolk democracy
- Ketuanan Melayu
- Monoethnicity
- Nationalism
- South Africa under apartheid
- Superstratum
- White separatism
- White nationalism
