= Pierre L. van den Berghe =

Belgian-American sociologist, anthropologist and professor

- Born: 1933; Belgian Congo
- Died: 6 February 2019 (aged 85–86); Seattle, United States
- Education: Harvard University (PhD)
- Scientific career
- Fields: Sociology, anthropology
- Institutions: University of Washington, University of Natal
- Doctoral advisor: Talcott Parsons

Pierre L. van den Berghe (1933 – 6 February 2019) was a Congolese-born American professor emeritus of sociology and anthropology at the University of Washington, where he had worked since 1965.

Born in the Belgian Congo to Belgian parents, and spending World War II in occupied Belgium, he was an early witness to ethnic conflict and racism, which eventually led him to become a leading authority on ethnic relations. He conducted field work in South Africa, Mexico, Guatemala, Iran, Lebanon, Nigeria, Peru, and Israel. Early in his career, he lectured at the University of Natal alongside Leo Kuper and Fatima Meer. A student of Talcott Parsons at Harvard (receiving the PhD in 1960), he nevertheless had little interest in structural functionalism and was one of the first proponents of sociobiological approaches to social phenomena. Van den Berghe died on 6 February 2019.

== Selected works ==
- Van den Berghe, Pierre L. 1981. The Ethnic Phenomenon. New York: Elsevier.
- ---. 1979. Human Family Systems: An Evolutionary View. New York: Elsevier.
- ---. 1977. Inequality in the Peruvian Andes: Class and Ethnicity in Cuzco. Columbia: University of Missouri Press.
- ---. 1975. Man in Society: A Biosocial View. New York: Elsevier.
- ---. 1973. Age and Sex in Human Societies: A Biosocial Perspective. Belmont, Calif: Wadsworth Pub. Co.
- ---. 1972. Intergroup Relations: Sociological Perspectives. New York: Basic Books.
- ---. 1970. Academic Gamesmanship; How to Make a PhD Pay. London: Abelard-Schuman.
- ---. 1967. Race and Racism: A Comparative Perspective. NY; Sydney: Wiley.
- ---. 1965. Africa: Social Problems of Change and Conflict. San Francisco: Chandler Pub. Co.
- ---. 1964. Caneville; the Social Structure of a South African Town. Middletown, Conn: Wesleyan University Press.
