= Wendy Pullan (academic) =

British architectural scholar

Professor Wendy Pullan is a scholar of Architecture and Urban Studies at Clare College, Cambridge, and Director of the Centre for Urban Conflicts Research at Cambridge. She was head of the University of Cambridge's Architecture and Urban Studies Department from 2014 and 2017.

She published books and articles on European and Middle Eastern architecture and cities, urban heritage, conflict and change. In 2006, she received the Royal Institute of British Architects inaugural President's Award for University Led Research for work on Conflict in Cities.

== Bibliography ==
- Locating Urban Conflicts (2013)
- The Struggle for Jerusalem’s Holy Places (2013)
- Architecture and Pilgrimage 1000-1500: Southern Europe and Beyond (2013)
