= Race and Racism =

1942 book by Pierre L. van den Berghe

Race and Racism: A Comparative Perspective is a 1967 non-fiction book by Pierre L. van den Berghe, published by John Wiley & Sons.

The author discusses and contrasts the societies of Brazil, Mexico, South Africa, and the United States and their racial issues. Theodosius Dobzhansky, who reviewed the book for The Quarterly Review of Biology, described the work as "a serious and closely argued sociological study".

Augie Fleras, author of the book chapter "Race and Racism by Pierre van den Berghe: A Fifty Year Retrospect," described the work as a "seminal text on race relations" and "a contemporary classic". Reviewer J. Milton Yinger, who reviewed the book for Science, stated that the point of the book is to "contribute to the development of a comparative science of racism".

== Contents ==
There is an introduction characterized by Dobzhansky as "long", in which Berghe states his thesis.

In the final two chapters, the thesis is re-emphasized.

According to Dobzhansky, the book does not often discuss "Biological aspects of race".

== Reception ==
Oliver C. Cox of Lincoln University of Jefferson City, Missouri stated that the book "is certainly well worth reading" due to the "elaborate analysis" inside; he argued that he still had questions about the relationships between racial groups that the book had not provided answers for.

Yinger stated that the "acerbic style", inability "to examine instances of the rigidities and errors he laments" and "sweeping generalizations" hamper the book's introduction.
