= Ethnic democracy =

Alleged form of democratic government

The term ethnic democracy, as used by some political scientists, describes a governance system that combines a structured ethnic dominance with democratic, political and civil rights for all. Both the dominant ethnic group—typically an ethnic majority—and the minority ethnic groups have citizenship and are able to fully participate in the political process. However, critics of the "ethnic democracy" model argue it is a contradiction in terms, and thus conceptually inadequate or confusing; these critics allege that purported ethnic democracies, most notably Israel, are not democratic at all, or are at best a sort of semi-democracy.

Beyond the conceptual coherency of the term, scholars also disagree, in normative terms, on whether any purported ethnic democracies are a legitimate mode of governance. Proponents of their moral legitimacy may variously emphasize either their ethnic or democratic character in attempting to derive a base of legitimacy: arguments of the former type tend to argue that the preservation of the ethnic character of such states is paramount, and defend it even when it infringes upon democratic ideals; conversely, arguments of the second type emphasize the right of self-determination as a moral imperative. Other arguments include construing an ethnic democracy as a sort of "lesser evil", or as a just compromise between competing abstract principles. On the other hand, critics of the moral legitimacy of such states argue that there is a fundamental incompatibility between such values, contending that ethnic democracies are especially objectionable because they are in fact intrinsically undemocratic but present themselves as having a democratic façade, thereby "legitimating the illegitimate". Critics have also argued that, because of the competing and contradictory democratic and ethnocratic impulses of purported ethnic democracies, they are inherently unstable, prone to transforming either into an outright ethnocracy or abandoning their ethnic character; they also argue that such states are ineffective at managing inter-ethnic conflict, "freezing" or prolonging such conflicts.

The term "ethnic democracy" was first introduced by Professor Juan José Linz of Yale University in 1975, who used the term as functionally synonymous with Herrenvolk democracy: "a political system that is democratic for the dominant group but excludes, on the basis of ethnicity, other groups from the democratic process". It was subsequently and independently used by University of Haifa sociologist Professor Sammy Smooha in a book published in 1989, as a universalised model of the nature of the Israeli state. However, unlike Linz, Smooha and a number of other scholars have used the term to refer to a type of state that differs from Herrenvolk democracy (or ethnocracy) in having more purely democratic elements: they argue that Israel and other purported ethnic democracies provide the non-core groups with more political participation, influence and improvement of status than is typical under a Herrenvolk state. However, critical scholars have argued that the so-called "ethnic democracies" are not fundamentally different from Herrenvolk democracies or ethnocracies, or that the differences are of degree rather than kind. According to these critics, Herrenvolk democracy and ethnic democracy both share numerous key features, in particular hegemonic control and tyranny of the majority, but differ in tactics: when the minority is unmanageable or outright ceases to be a numerical minority, the dominant ethnic group resorts to the more repressive tactics of Herrenvolk democracy, but when the non-dominant ethnicities are smaller or weaker, the dominant group maintains a façade of democracy.

Besides Israel, the model has since been used by political scientists to describe a number of other governments, including those of Northern Ireland, Estonia, Latvia, and Slovakia.

== Model definition ==
Smooha defines eight features that are the core elements of his model of an ethnic democracy:

1. Ethnic nationalism installs a single core ethnic nation in the state.
2. The state separates membership in the single core ethnic nation from citizenship.
3. The state is owned and ruled by the core ethnic nation.
4. The state mobilises the core ethnic nation.
5. Non-core groups are accorded incomplete individual and collective rights.
6. The state allows non-core groups to conduct parliamentary and extra-parliamentary struggle for change.
7. The state perceives non-core groups as a threat.
8. The state imposes some control on non-core groups.

Smooha also defines ten conditions that can lead to the establishment of an ethnic democracy:

1. The core ethnic nation constitutes a solid numerical majority.
2. The non-core population constitutes a significant minority.
3. The core ethnic nation has a commitment to democracy.
4. The core ethnic nation is an indigenous group.
5. The non-core groups are immigrant.
6. The non-core group is divided into more than one ethnic group.
7. The core ethnic nation has a sizeable, supportive Diaspora.
8. The homelands of the non-core groups are involved.
9. There is international involvement.
10. Transition from a non-democratic ethnic state has taken place.

== Applicability of the model ==
The model has been applied by researchers to several countries, with various levels of fit.

=== Israel ===
Smooha first used the term ethnic democracy as a generalized model of the Israeli model of governance, which he has argued is country that utilises the ethnic democracy model in its relations with the country's Arab minority. According to this view, Israel has combined viable democratic institutions with institutionalized ethnic dominance.

=== Latvia and Estonia ===
There is a spectrum of opinion among authors as to the classification of Latvia and Estonia, spanning from liberal or civic democracy through ethnic democracy to Ethnocracy. Will Kymlicka regards Estonia as a civic democracy, stressing the peculiar status of Russian-speakers, stemming from being at once partly transients, partly immigrants and partly natives. British researcher Neil Melvin concludes that Estonia is moving towards a genuinely pluralist democratic society through its liberalization of citizenship and actively drawing of leaders of the Russian-speaking communities into the political process. James Hughes, in the United Nations Development Programme's Development and Transition, contends Latvia and Estonia are cases of ‘ethnic democracy’ where the state has been captured by the titular ethnic group and then used to promote ‘nationalising’ policies and alleged discrimination against Russophone minorities. (Development and Transition has also published papers disputing Hughes' contentions.) Israeli researchers Oren Yiftachel and As’ad Ghanem consider Estonia as an ethnocracy. Israeli sociologist Sammy Smooha, of the University of Haifa, disagrees with Yiftachel, contending that the ethnocratic model developed by Yiftachel does not fit the case of Latvia and Estonia; it is not a settler society as its core ethnic group is indigenous, nor did it expand territorially or have a diaspora intervening in its internal affairs as in the case of Israel for which Yiftachel originally developed his model.

However the notion that Estonia or Latvia are ethnic democracies has been rejected by some commentators. On the one hand, the citizenship laws of these countries are not based on ethnic criteria, treating citizens of Russian extract, including a number of people who automatically became citizens because their families have resided there since before 1940, with the same rights as the ethnic majorities. Moreover, non-citizens enjoy social rights on a par with citizens. On the other hand, given the proportion of non-citizen minorities without certain political rights (7.5% in the case of Estonia), Estonia and Latvia may not yet even qualify as ethnic democracies: in Smooha's definition of ethnic democracy, minority groups should enjoy full rights as citizens of the country.

=== Canada ===
Smooha describes Canada from independence in 1867 to the Quiet Revolution of 1976, which raised the status of French Canadians to the level of English Canadians, to have been an ethnic democracy.

=== Northern Ireland ===
Smooha describes the Government of Northern Ireland (1921–1972) from the Partition of Ireland in 1921 to the Sunningdale Agreement in 1972 as an ethnic democracy, favoring Protestants of mainly Ulster Scots descent to the native Irish Catholics.

=== Malaysia ===
Article 153 of the Constitution of Malaysia, as well as the Ketuanan Melayu (Malay supremacy) ideology followed by post-independence Malaysian governments since the 1970s, gives more rights to the Bumiputra in general and to Malaysian Malays than to Malaysian minorities, such as Malaysian Chinese and Malaysian Indians.

=== Slovakia ===
Slovak nationalism is grounded in ethnicity and language. "State-building and nation-building in Slovakia are designed to install ethnic Slovaks as the sole nation and to prevent any sign of binationalism. This objective is made clear in the preamble of the Slovak constitution which begins with the following words: “We, the Slovak nation, bearing in mind the political and cultural heritage of our predecessors, the experience gained through centuries of struggle for our national existence and statehood…”

== Bibliography ==
- Sammy Smooha, The Model of Ethnic Democracy, ECMI Working Paper No 13, October 2001
