= Oren Yiftachel =

Israeli professor of urban studies

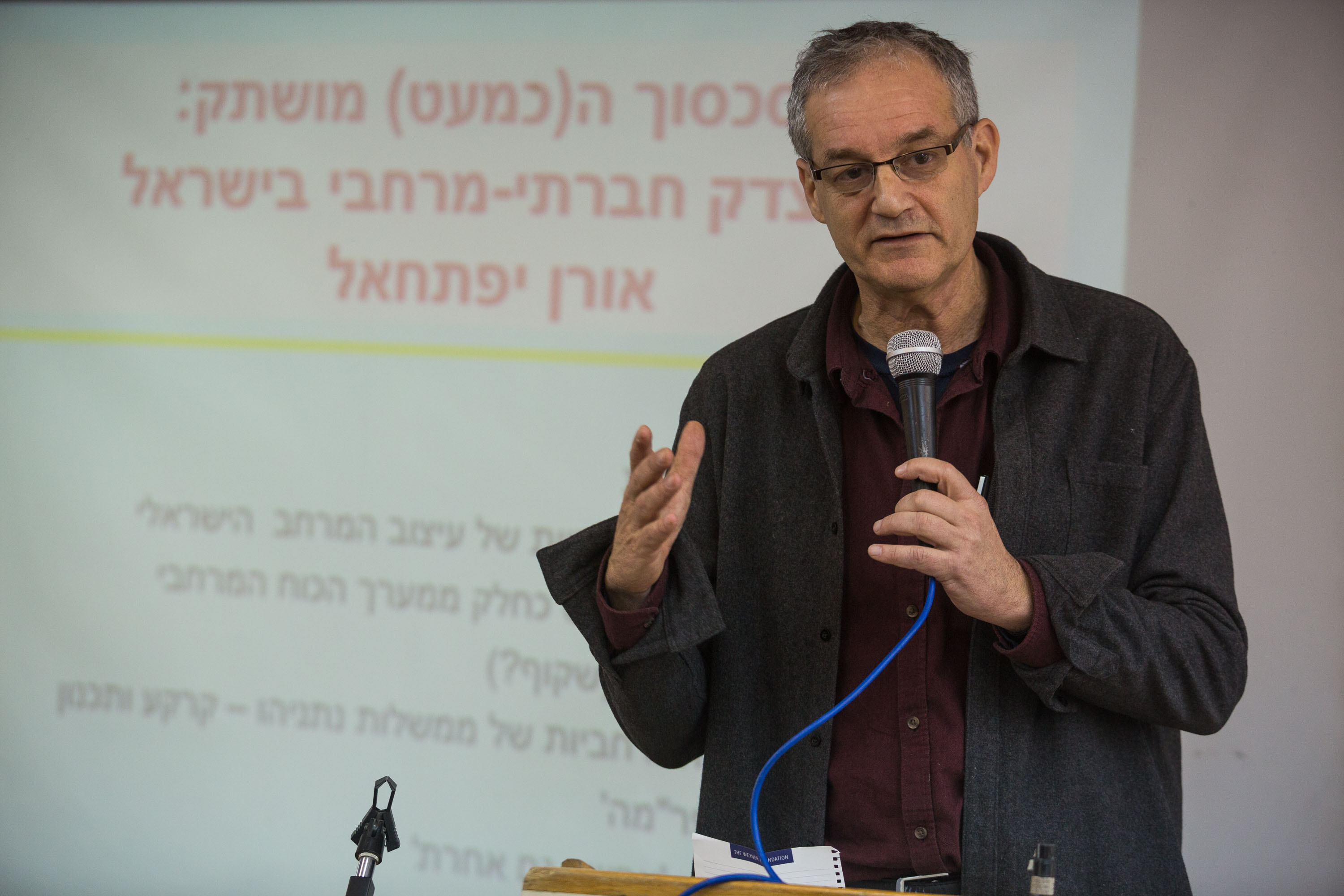
Tel Aviv

Oren Yiftachel (Hebrew: אורן יפתחאל; Arabic اورن يفتحئل) is a professor (em.) of political and legal geography, urban studies and urban planning at Ben-Gurion University of the Negev, in Beersheba where he holds the Lynn and Lloyd Hurst Family Chair in Urban Studies and co-heads the BGUrban lab. He is also a Professor (hon.) of the Geography and DPU Departments at University College, London.

== Early life and education ==
Yiftachel was born in Haifa and grew up on socialist kibbutz Matzuva in the Galilee. He earned a Bachelor of Arts in Urban and Regional Studies at the Western Australian Institute of Technology in 1983. He completed graduate studies in Urban and Regional Planning at Curtin University, Perth in 1986. In 1990, he received a Doctor of Philosophy from the Department of Geography at the University of Western Australia, in cooperation with the Faculty of Architecture and Town Planning at the Technion – Israel Institute of Technology. where he was also a post-doctoral fellow.

== Career ==
Yiftachel served as a Planning Assistant for the Perth firm "Planning Collaborative", and later worked as a Planning Officer for the Perth City Council until 1984-1987. In Israel during the 1990s Yiftachel worked with the Technion and Mazor-First Planners firm as coordinator of the "Israel 2020" project; as consultant to the Kibbutz Planning Office; and later as social consultant to the Beersheba Metropolitan Plan . Later, he has worked on an Israeli-Palestinian plan for a bi-national Jerusalem, and for a decade became the planner of the RCUV - Regional Council of Unrecognized Bedouins Villages, producing in 2013 a major alternative regional plan for recognition and development of all localities.

Yiftachel's teaching career began at the Curtin University from 1987 to 1993. Since 1993, he has been a professor for the Department of Geography at Ben-Gurion University, earning tenure in 1996. During this time, Yiftachel has served as a visiting fellow and a visiting professor for brief periods of time at a variety of institutions, including the Royal Melbourne Institute of Technology, the US Institute of Peace, the University of California, Berkeley, the University of Queens, Belfast, Columbia University New York, Upenn, Philadelphia, the University of Venice. Politecnico Milan and Capte Town University. Yiftachel was also a Leverhulme professor at University College London (Geography and the Bartlett), and as a research fellow at the Van Leer Jerusalem Institute. Yiftachel was a board member of the Israeli Planning Association and the Association of Geographers for several periods.

Yiftachel has supervised dozens of graduate students in M.A., PhD and Postdoctorat studied, 15 of whom have gone to become lecturers and professors in Israeli and international academic institutions.

Yiftachel was the founding editor of the journal Hagar: International Social Science Research, and was its editor-in-chief from 1999 to 2004. He has served on the editorial board of various other journals, including City (collective editorial), Urban Studies, Planning Theory, Environment and Planning, Space and Polity, Cities; Middle East Report, Journal of Planning Literature, International Journal of Middle East Studies, and Israel Studies Forum.

== Activism and Advocacy ==
Yiftachel is a renowned political activist in several notable organizations, including Faculty for Israel-Palestine Peace (FFIPP), Palestinian-Israeli Academics (PALISAD), The Negev Coexistence Forum, the Adva Center's Center for Social Equity (foundation board member), Habitat International Coalition. Yiftachel served as board member and later Co-Chair of B'Tselem (the information center for Palestinian human rights) from 2006 to 2017, and as B'tselem reports committee member until 2022. Yiftachel has advocated for Bedouin land and planning rights since the 1990s, in planning committees, government offices and expert witness in legal land claims He was an active member in the protest for social justice during 2011-12, and has worked since with public housing, asylum seekers and marginalized group for planning and urban rights. In 2012, he co-founded the joint Israeli-Palestinian peace movement "A Land for All -- Two States, One Homeland", where he is an assembly member and chief researcher. He is an occasional op-ed contributor to leading Israeli newspapers, including Haaretz, Ynet, Ma'ariv, Bukra, +972, and Local Call. Yiftachel is a member of Academia for Equality, and Academic for Peace.

== Scholarship ==
Yiftachel's 2026 curriculum vitae (Yiftachel CV 2026a.pdf) shows he has been "ranked first among Israeli" scholars according to the Stanford-Elsevier "Top 2% Scientists Index" (https://topresearcherslist.com/) in the fields of geography, planning, and urban studies since 2020.

Yiftachel's works develop critical perspectives of space and power; minorities and public policy; 'ethnocratic' societies and land regimes. His early scholarship in urban and planning studies focused on Australian metropolitan planning and its impact on 'urban social sustainability'. He later developed a theory of the 'dark side' of urban planning and has contributed to opening up planning theory to critical theory in general, and to issues of identity, colonization and space in particular.

In recent years he has developed a theory of gray space and 'displaceability' as underlining condition of new urban regimes and citizenship. In parallel, he developed with colleagues a model of 'doing the just city' as a theoretical and professional alternative. In political geography, his work formulated the concept of 'ethnocratic' regimes, which has generated debates in ethnic and racial studies, regime theories and research in Israel/Palestine. His comparative work has focused on comparatively analyzing spatial policy towards minorities in a range of 'ethnocratic' states and cities, most particularly Australia, Sri Lanka, Estonia, Cyprus, Bosnia, Northern Ireland and South Africa. Yiftachel has worked on the political and legal geography of indigenous peoples, focusing on Bedouins in Israel/Palestine in a comparative framework, and developed concepts such as 'gray spacing', 'metrozenship' and 'urban displaceability'.

In a series of books and articles, Yiftachel explores comparatively the types of regimes that typically develop under condition of ethnic conflict. In this framework, he conceptualizes the Israeli regime as an ethnocracy, promoting a dominant project of 'ethnicization' throughout Israel/Palestine, in which ethnicity dominates citizenship. He documents the various practices of this project, and the manner in which it has constructed ethno-class identities and stratified citizenship through the process of expansion, development, projects of Judaization and politicization in the different regions of Israel/Palestine. His model traces the nature of the Zionist project, taking into account the historical circumstances spawning Jewish 'colonization of refugees'. His early work also focused on the tension between liberal and ethnocratic-religious components of the Israeli regime, and on the privileged status given European over Eastern Jews established during the settlement project, but also the recent closing of the gaps through on-going colonization of Palestinian lands.

Palestinians are relegated to the status of 'unwanted' indigenous peoples resisting the ethnocratic project. Yiftachel uses a multidisciplinary approach, inspired by Neo-Gramscian thinking and by a range of Marxian, post- and neo-colonial theorists. In the study of Israel/Palestine he was one of the first to break the traditional scholarly divisions between analysis of Arab-Jewish relations and internal Jewish dynamics, and one of a handful of scholars to question whether Israel acts as a democratic state within the Green Line (Israeli pre-1967 borders). The Israeli regime, according to Yiftachel, has presided over the entire historic Palestine for over five decades, and should be analyzed according to the power structures he claims it imposed over the entire territory. Yiftachel developed the 'settler-ethnocratic' model to highlight the regime's main historical-material logic, and the concept of 'creeping apartheid' to describe its recent manifestation and the development of four different 'separate and unequal' types of citizenship under the Israeli regime.

Yiftachel's work has developed a dynamic 'conceptual architecture', which -- beyond the concepts above, also coined and developed terms such as 'trapped minorities', 'fractured regions', 'ruptured demos', 'internal frontiers', 'frontiphery' (frontier that becomes periphery), 'gray spacing', 'displaceability', 'privatination' (a combined privatization of nationalized land and housing), 'creeping urban apartheid', and 'digital apartheid'. His recent work also develops a 'South-Eastern' perspective, and aims to provide alternative conceptualizations to the dominant theories and discourses generated by American and European academic centers; as well as exploring the development and struggles of 'digital urban citizenship. A special issue of the journal Cosmopolitan Civil Society (2016) was devoted to the theory of ethnocratic regimes, two decades after their formulation by Yiftachel.

== Publications ==
Yiftachel has published over 120 articles, 12 books and 6 edited special iisues. Among them:

Author (books)

- Yiftachel, O. (1992). Planning a Mixed Region in Israel: The Political Geography of Arab-Jewish Relations in the Galilee, Avebury, Gower Publishing Limited, Aldershot, Hampshire, UK, 376pp, 44 maps and figures, 39 tables, 13 plates. ISBN 1-85628-255-4.
- Yiftachel, O. (1995). Planning as Control: Policy and Resistance in Deeply Divided Societies, Progress in Planning Series, Vol. 44, Pergamon-Elsvier, Oxford, UK, 89 pages, 9 figures, 4 tables, ISBN 0-0804-2656-5.
- Yiftachel, O. (1997). Guardians of the Vineyard: Majd al-Krum as Fable, The Institute for Israeli Arab Studies (The 'Seam-line Series'), Beit Berl; 126 pp., 7 maps and figures, 6 tables, ISBN 9654540223 (Hebrew).
- Yiftachel, O. (2006). Ethnocracy: Land and Identity Politics in Israel/Palestine (The University of Pennsylvania Press, 306 pp. 26 figures, 4 tables; translated to five languages).
- Kedar, S., Amara, A.' Yiftachel, O. (2018), Emptied Lands: Legal Geography of Bedouin Rights in the Negev, Stanford: Stanford University Press. Publish in Arabic by Madar Center, Ramallah, 2020; in Hebrew (updated two new chapters), 2025 with Pardes Publishers, Haifa..
- Yiftachel, O, (2021), Land and Power: Israel/Palestine from Ethnocracy to Deepening Apartheid, Tel-Aviv, Resling (Hebrew).

Editor (books)

- Hedgcock, D., & Yiftachel, O., eds. (1992). Urban and Regional Planning in Western Australia: Historical and Critical Perspectives, Paradigm Press, Perth, 306pp, 34 maps and figures, ISBN 1-8634-2172-6
- Yiftachel, O., & Meir, A., eds. (1998). Ethnic Frontiers in Israel: Landscapes of Development and Inequality in Israel, Boulder, Westview Press, 337 pages, 18 tables, 25 maps and figures, ISBN 0-8133-8929-1.
- Yiftachel, O.; Alexander, I.; Hedgcock, D.; & Little, J., eds. (2001). The Power of Planning: Spaces of Control and Transformation, Kluwer Academic Publications, the Hague; ISBN, 214 pp.; 6 tables, 17 figures). ISBN 1-4020-0533-4.
- Kemp, A., Yiftachel, O., Newman, D., Ram, U., eds. (2004). Hegemonies and Resistance: Israelis in Conflict, (280 pp., 4 tables, 11 figures; Sussex Academic Press) ISBN 1-903900-65-4.
- Amara, A., Yiftachel, O. & Abu-Saad, I. (eds), (2013). Indigenous (In)Justice? Human Rights among Bedouins in Southern Israel/Palestine, Cambridge, Massachusetts, Harvard University Press.
- Yiftachel, O. and Mammon, N. (eds) 2023, TheoriSE: the Southeastern Turn in Urban Studies, African Centre for Cities, Cape Town.

Editor ( Journal special issues)

- Yiftachel, O.; & Abu-Saad, I., eds. (2008). "Bedouin-Arabs Society in the Negev", Special theme issue of Hagar: Studies in Culture, Politics and Identity, Vol. 8. 257pp, 16 tables, 13 figures, 52 photographs).
- Ghanem, A. & Yiftachel, O., eds. (2010). "The Vision Documents: a New Order for Arab-Jewish Relations in Israel?", Special theme issue of State and Society, 165 pp, 3 figures, 4 table (Hebrew).
- Yiftachel, O. & Mandelbaum, R., eds. (2015). "Social Justice and Israel Planning", Special Issue of Planning – Journal of the Israeli Planning Association, Vol. 12, No. 1: 145-270.
- Yiftachel, O. & Porter, L., eds. (2019). "Settler Colonialism, Indigeneity and the City", special issue of Settler Colonial Studies, Vol. 8
- Gawlewicz, A. and Yiftachel, O. (eds) 2022, 'Throwntogetherness' in Hostile Environment, City, Vol. 26: 2-3
- Ansenberg, U., Tzfadia, E., Yiftachel, O. and Haas, O. 2025, "Displaceability’: Southeastern perspectives from Israel/Palestine on Urban Citizenship": Environment and Planning C: Vol. 43(8) https://journals.sagepub.com/toc/EPC/current
