= Henry Siegman =

German-born American (born 1930)

- Born: 1930 (age 95–96); Frankfurt, Germany
- Occupations: Writer and journalist

Henry Siegman (born 1930) is a German-born American. He is President of the U.S./Middle East Project (USMEP), an initiative focused on U.S.-Middle East policy that strives to advance peace through a dignified resolution of the Israeli–Palestinian conflict. To examine how those issues interact with the shifting terrain of global geopolitics, it was launched by the Council on Foreign Relations in 1994, and established as an independent policy institute in 2006, originally under the chairmanship of General (Ret.) Brent Scowcroftand. As of July 1, 2016 Siegman assumed the title of President Emeritus of the USMEP.

Mr. Siegman is a former National Director of the American Jewish Congress, serving as its executive director for 16 years. He is a former non-resident visiting research professor at the Sir Joseph Hotung Middle East Program of the School of Oriental and African Studies, University of London and a former Senior Fellow on the Middle East at the Council on Foreign Relations.

== Early life and education ==
Siegman, a Jewish American, was born in 1930 in Frankfurt, Germany. Moving to the United States, Siegman studied and was ordained as an Orthodox Rabbi by Yeshiva Torah Vodaas. He served as a United States Army chaplain in the Korean War, where he was awarded the Bronze Star Medal and the Purple Heart.

== Career ==
He is a former senior fellow at the Council on Foreign Relations. Prior to that, he was the executive director of the American Jewish Congress (1978–1994).

== Political views ==
Siegman is a critic of Israeli policies in the West Bank.

He refers to Israel as a "de-facto apartheid" state and has said in 2012 and 2014 that, without substantial objective change, the "two-state solution is dead".

Siegman supports the idea of moral equivalence in the Israeli–Palestinian conflict. He advocates engagement with Hamas and believes that Palestinian Authority president Mahmoud Abbas is able to form a unity government between Hamas and his own Fatah and make peace with Israel. Siegman met with Hamas' leader Khaled Mashal in Syria.

He says that Yasser Arafat made a "disastrous mistake" in rejecting the peace offer, but that "based on my 14 years of dealings with Arafat, I reject the notion that he was bent on Israel's destruction". Siegman is critical of Ariel Sharon, about whom he wrote: "The war Sharon is waging is not aimed at the defeat of Palestinian terrorism but at the defeat of the Palestinian people and their aspirations for national self-determination".

He strongly defended former president Jimmy Carter's book Palestine: Peace Not Apartheid. He has also criticized the peace efforts by Ehud Olmert and George W. Bush. Siegman has described the process as a "scam" because of a "consensus reached long ago by Israel's decision-making elites that Israel will never allow the emergence of a Palestinian state".

== Reception ==
Jeffrey Donovan, writing in Radio Free Europe, calls him "a leading U.S. expert on the Middle East".

Nathan Guttman, writing in The Forward said that Siegman helped to publicize the "Saudi plan", after it was revealed publicly for the first time in The New York Times. In addition, Guttman writes that Siegman is in the "far-left corner of the Middle East worldview".

Journalist David Rieff said, in 2004, that Siegman is "perhaps the most perceptive American observer-participant in the last two decades of Israeli-Palestinian negotiations".

Abraham Foxman, national director of the Anti-Defamation League, said that Siegman was known as holding left-of-center views that fit with the American Jewish Congress's liberal approach, and that "when he left the organization, it became clearer he was no longer a critic of Israel, that his criticism borders being anti-Israel".

== See also ==
- New Historians
- Jewish Voice for Peace
- Ilan Pappé
- Post-Zionism
- Shlomo Sand
