= Sammy Smooha =

Israeli researcher and professor of sociology, Israel Prize laureate

- סמי סמוחה
- Born: 1941 (age 84–85)
- Occupation: Professor of Sociology
- Known for: Concept of ethnic democracy
- Awards: Israel Prize

Sammy Smooha (Hebrew: סמי סמוחה; born 1941) is a Professor of Sociology at the University of Haifa.

== Biography ==
He is recipient of the Israel Prize. He specializes in comparative ethnic relations, and has researched the internal divisions in Israeli society, and the society of Israel in comparative perspective.

Smooha introduced the concept of ethnic democracy, in a book published in 1989. Smooha contends that Israel is a model or archetypical ethnic democracy.

== Books ==
- Index of Arab-Jewish Relations in Israel 2004. Haifa: The Jewish-Arab Center, University of Haifa; Jerusalem: The Citizens' Accord Forum between Jews and Arabs in Israel; Tel Aviv: Friedrich Ebert Stiftung. 2005.
- Autonomy for Arabs in Israel. Beit Berl: The Institute for Israeli Arab Studies, 1999, 143 pages. (Hebrew).
- Arabs and Jews in Israel. Vol. 2: Change and Continuity in Mutual Intolerance. Boulder and London: Westview Press, 1992.
- Arabs and Jews in Israel. Vol. 1: Conflicting and Shared Attitudes in a Divided Society. Boulder and London: Westview Press, 1989.
- The Orientation and Politicization of the Arab Minority in Israel. Haifa: The Jewish-Arab Center, University of Haifa, 1984.
- Israel: Pluralism and Conflict. London: Routledge and Kegan Paul; Berkeley and Los Angeles: University of California Press, 1978.
