= Democracy =

Government system where political power lies with the people

Democracy (Note: from Ancient Greek: δημοκρατία, romanized: dēmokratía, from dēmos 'people' and krátos 'rule') is a form of government in which political power is vested in the people of a certain state. Under a narrow definition of democracy, rulers are elected through competitive elections, while broader definitions also link democracy to guarantees of civil liberties and human rights.

In a direct democracy, the people have the primary authority to deliberate and decide legislation. In a representative democracy, the people elect governing officials to do so. The definition of "the people" and the ways authority is shared among them or delegated by them have changed over time and at varying rates in different countries. Features of democracy often include freedom of assembly, freedom of association, freedom of religion, and freedom of speech; other features include citizenship rights, property rights, voting rights, the right to life, minority rights, liberty, and consent of the governed.

Forms of democracy has evolved considerably over time. The current dominant form of democracy is representative democracy, where citizens elect government officials to govern on their behalf such as in a parliamentary or presidential democracy. In the common variant of liberal democracy, the powers of the majority are exercised within the framework of a representative democracy, but a constitution and supreme court limit the majority and protect the minority—usually through securing the enjoyment by all of certain individual rights, such as freedom of speech or freedom of association.

The term appeared in the 5th century BC in Greek city-states, notably Classical Athens, to mean "rule of the people", in contrast to aristocracy (ἀριστοκρατία, aristokratía), meaning "rule of an elite". In virtually all democratic governments throughout ancient and modern history, democratic citizenship was initially restricted to an elite class, which was later extended to all adult citizens. In most modern democracies, this was achieved through the suffrage movements of the 19th and 20th centuries.

Democracy contrasts with forms of government where power is not vested in the general population of a state, such as authoritarian systems. Historically a rare and vulnerable form of government, democratic systems of government have become more prevalent since the 19th century, in particular with various waves of democratization. Democracy garners considerable legitimacy in the modern world, as public opinion across regions tends to strongly favor democratic systems of government relative to alternatives, and as even authoritarian states try to present themselves as democratic. Democracy more consistently results in improved health, education and economic outcomes. According to the V-Dem Democracy indices and The Economist Democracy Index, less than half the world's population lives in a democracy as of 2022. At the same time, while representative democracy is widely valued, Pew Research Center found that dissatisfaction with democratic performance is common even in many established democracies.

== Characteristics ==
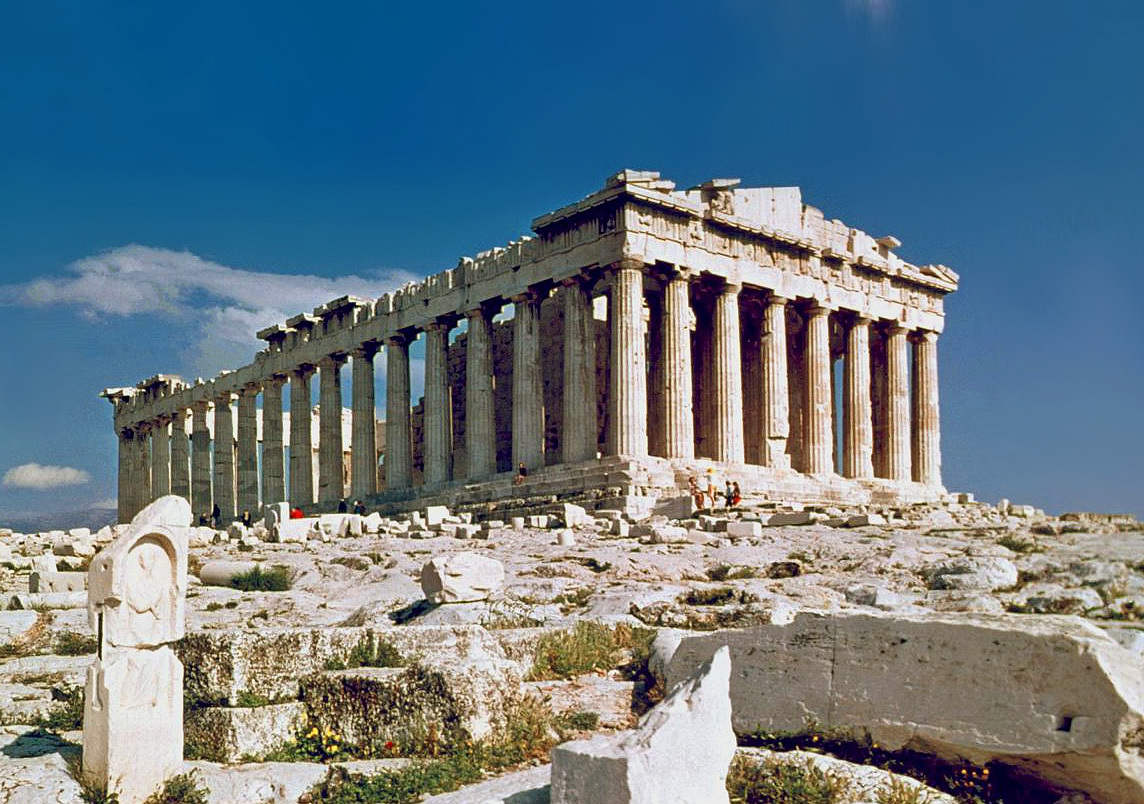
The Parthenon is considered a symbol of democracy.

An interactive chart of democracies by Freedom House

In purely representative democracies, democracy is understood to be defined by free voting. No consensus exists on a precise definition of democracy and many approaches have been taken to define it. One study identified 2,234 adjectives used to describe democracy in the English language.

Yet, there is a profound understanding of its meaning, like that of Abraham Lincoln, describing it as "Government of the people, by the people, for the people." Karl Popper said that the classical view of democracy is, "the theory that democracy is the rule of the people and that the people have a right to rule".

Democratic principles are reflected in all eligible citizens being equal before the law and having equal access to legislative processes, even if not every vote cast elects someone.

For example, in a representative democracy, every vote has (in theory) equal weight, and the freedom of eligible citizens is secured by legitimised rights and liberties which are typically enshrined in a constitution. Other uses of "democracy" may encompass direct democracy, in which citizens vote on issues directly. According to the United Nations, democracy "provides an environment that respects human rights and fundamental freedoms, and in which the freely expressed will of people is exercised."

One theory holds that democracy requires three fundamental principles: upward control (sovereignty residing at the lowest levels of authority), political equality, and social norms by which individuals and institutions only consider acceptable acts that reflect the first two principles of upward control. Legal equality, political freedom and rule of law are often identified by commentators as foundational characteristics for a well-functioning democracy.

In some countries, notably in the United Kingdom (which originated the Westminster system), the dominant principle is that of parliamentary sovereignty, while maintaining judicial independence. In India, parliamentary sovereignty is subject to the Constitution of India which includes judicial review. Though the term "democracy" is typically used in the context of a political state, the principles also are potentially applicable to private organisations, such as clubs, societies and firms.

Democracies may use many different decision-making methods, but majority rule is the dominant form. Without compensation, like legal protections of individual or group rights, political minorities can be oppressed by the "tyranny of the majority". Majority rule involves a competitive approach, opposed to consensus democracy, creating the need that elections, and generally deliberation, be substantively and procedurally "fair", i.e., just and equitable. In some countries, freedom of political expression, freedom of speech, and freedom of the press are considered important to ensure that voters are well informed, enabling them to vote according to their own interests and beliefs.

It has also been suggested that a basic feature of democracy is the capacity of all voters to participate freely and fully in the life of their society. With its emphasis on notions of social contract and the collective will of all the voters, democracy can also be characterised as a form of political collectivism because it is defined as a form of government in which all eligible citizens have an equal say in lawmaking.

Republics, though often popularly associated with democracy because of the shared principle of rule by consent of the governed, are not necessarily democracies, as republicanism does not specify how the people are to rule. Classically the term "republic" encompassed both democracies and aristocracies and their mixtures. In a modern sense the republican form of government is a form of government without a monarch. Because of this, democracies can be republics or constitutional monarchies, such as the United Kingdom, where the monarch is not a ruler.

== History ==
Age of democracy polity

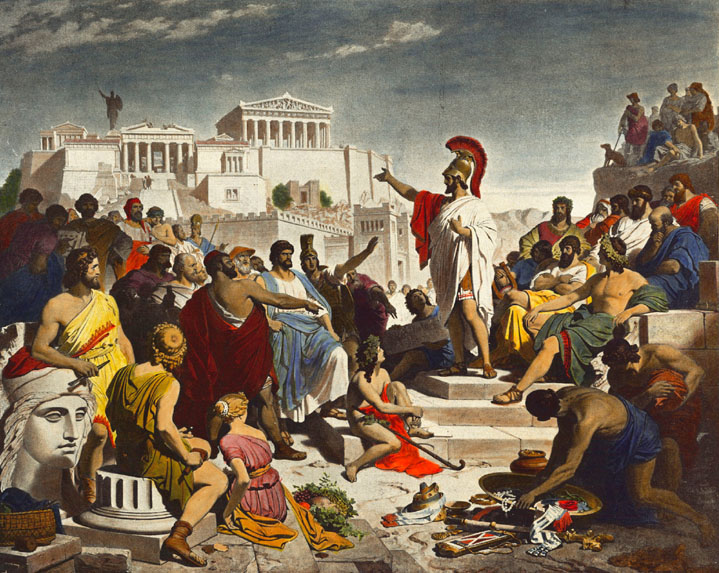
Nineteenth-century painting by Philipp Foltz depicting the Athenian politician Pericles delivering his famous funeral oration in front of the Assembly

Democratic assemblies are found throughout human history, but until the nineteenth century, major political figures largely opposed democracy. Republican theorists linked democracy to smaller expanse: as political units grew in size, the likelihood increased that the government would turn despotic. At the same time, small political units were vulnerable to conquest. Montesquieu wrote, "If a republic be small, it is destroyed by a foreign force; if it is large, it is ruined by an internal imperfection." According to Johns Hopkins University political scientist Daniel Deudney, the creation of the United States, with its large size and its system of checks and balances, was a solution to the dual problems of size. Forms of democracy occurred organically in societies around the world that had no contact with each other.

=== Origins ===
==== Greece and Rome ====
The term democracy first appeared in ancient Greek political and philosophical thought in the city-state of Athens during classical antiquity. The word comes from dêmos '(common) people' and krátos 'force/might'. Under Cleisthenes, the first democracy in the sixth-century BC (508–507 BC) was established in Athens. Cleisthenes is referred to as "the father of Athenian democracy". The first attested use of the word democracy is found in prose works of the 430s BC, such as Herodotus' Histories, but its usage was older by several decades, as two Athenians born in the 470s were named Democrates, a new political name—likely in support of democracy—given at a time of debates over constitutional issues in Athens. Aeschylus also strongly alludes to the word in his play The Suppliants, staged in c.463 BC, where he mentions "the demos's ruling hand" [demou kratousa cheir]. Before that time, the word used to define the new political system of Cleisthenes was probably isonomia, meaning political equality.

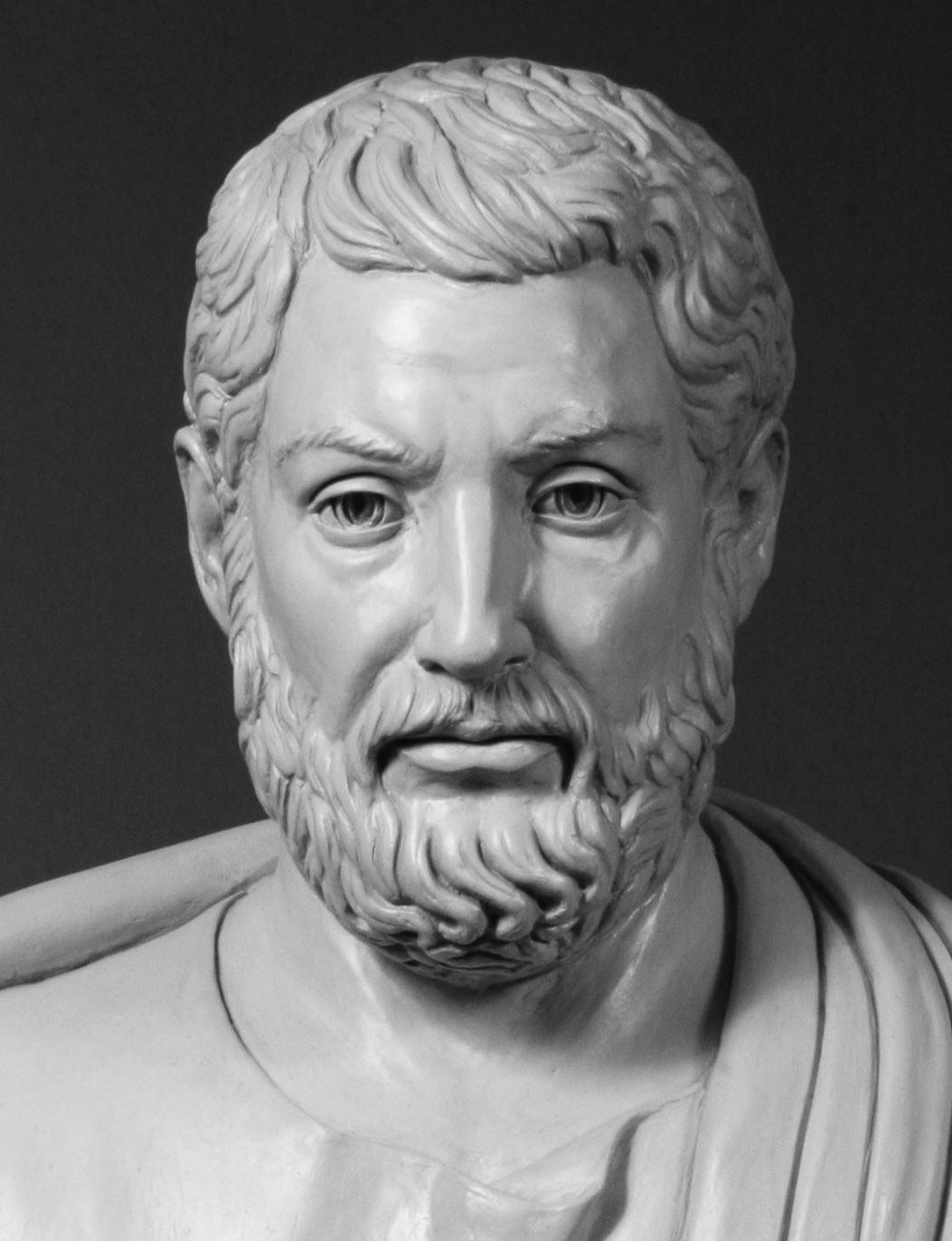
Modern bust of Cleisthenes, known as "the father of Athenian democracy", on view at the Ohio Statehouse, Columbus, Ohio

Athenian democracy took the form of direct democracy, and it had two distinguishing features: the random selection of ordinary citizens to fill the few existing government administrative and judicial offices, and a legislative assembly consisting of all Athenian citizens. All eligible citizens were allowed to speak and vote in the assembly, which set the laws of the city-state. However, Athenian citizenship excluded women, slaves, foreigners (μέτοικοι / métoikoi), and youths below the age of military service. Effectively, only 1 in 4 residents in Athens qualified as citizens. Owning land was not a requirement for citizenship. The exclusion of large parts of the population from the citizen body is closely related to the ancient understanding of citizenship. In most of antiquity the benefit of citizenship was tied to the obligation to fight war campaigns.

Athenian democracy was not only direct in the sense that decisions were made by the assembled people, but also the most direct in the sense that the people through the assembly, boule and courts of law controlled the entire political process and a large proportion of citizens were involved constantly in the public business. Even though the rights of the individual were not secured by the Athenian constitution in the modern sense (the ancient Greeks had no word for "rights"), those who were citizens of Athens enjoyed their liberties not in opposition to the government but by living in a city that was not subject to another power and by not being subjects themselves to the rule of another person.

Range voting appeared in Sparta as early as 700 BC. The Spartan ecclesia was an assembly of the people, held once a month, in which every male citizen of at least 20 years of age could participate. In the assembly, Spartans elected leaders and cast votes by range voting and shouting, with the vote decided based on the volume of the shouting. Aristotle considered this immature, compared with the stone voting ballots used by the Athenian citizenry. Sparta adopted it because of its simplicity, to prevent biased voting and bribery that was predominant in the early democratic elections.

Statue of Athena, the patron goddess of Athens, in front of the Academy of Athens. Athena has been used as an international symbol of freedom and democracy since at least the late eighteenth century.

In addition, the overthrow of the Roman Kingdom created a system with a democratic element in the form of many different popular assamblies.

Even though the Roman Republic contributed significantly to many aspects of democracy, only a fraction of Romans were citizens with votes in elections for magistrates. The votes of the powerful were given more weight through a system of weighted voting, so most high officials, including members of the Senate, came from a few wealthy and noble families. The Roman model of governance inspired many political thinkers over the centuries.

==== Ancient India ====
Vaishali, capital city of the Vajjika League (Vrijji mahajanapada) of India, is considered one of the first examples of a republic around the 6th century BC.

==== Americas ====
Other cultures, such as the Iroquois in the Americas also developed a form of democratic society between 1450 and 1660 (and possibly in 1142), well before contact with the Europeans. This democracy continues to the present day and is the world's oldest standing representative democracy.

=== Middle Ages ===
While most regions in Europe during the Middle Ages were ruled by clergy or feudal lords, there existed various systems involving elections or assemblies, although often only involving a small part of the population. In Scandinavia, bodies known as things consisted of freemen presided by a lawspeaker. These deliberative bodies were responsible for settling political questions, and variants included the Althing in Iceland and the Løgting in the Faeroe Islands. The veche, found in Eastern Europe, was a similar body to the Scandinavian thing. In the Roman Catholic Church, the pope has been elected by a papal conclave composed of cardinals since 1059. The first documented parliamentary body in Europe was the Cortes of León. Established by Alfonso IX in 1188, the Cortes had authority over setting taxation, foreign affairs and legislating, though the exact nature of its role remains disputed. The Republic of Ragusa, established in 1358 and centered around the city of Dubrovnik, provided representation and voting rights to its male aristocracy only. Various Italian city-states and polities had republic forms of government. For instance, the Republic of Florence, established in 1115, was led by the Signoria whose members were chosen by sortition. In the 10th–15th century Frisia, a distinctly non-feudal society, the right to vote on local matters and on county officials was based on land size. The Kouroukan Fouga divided the Mali Empire into ruling clans (lineages) that were represented at a great assembly called the Gbara. However, the charter made Mali more similar to a constitutional monarchy than a democratic republic.

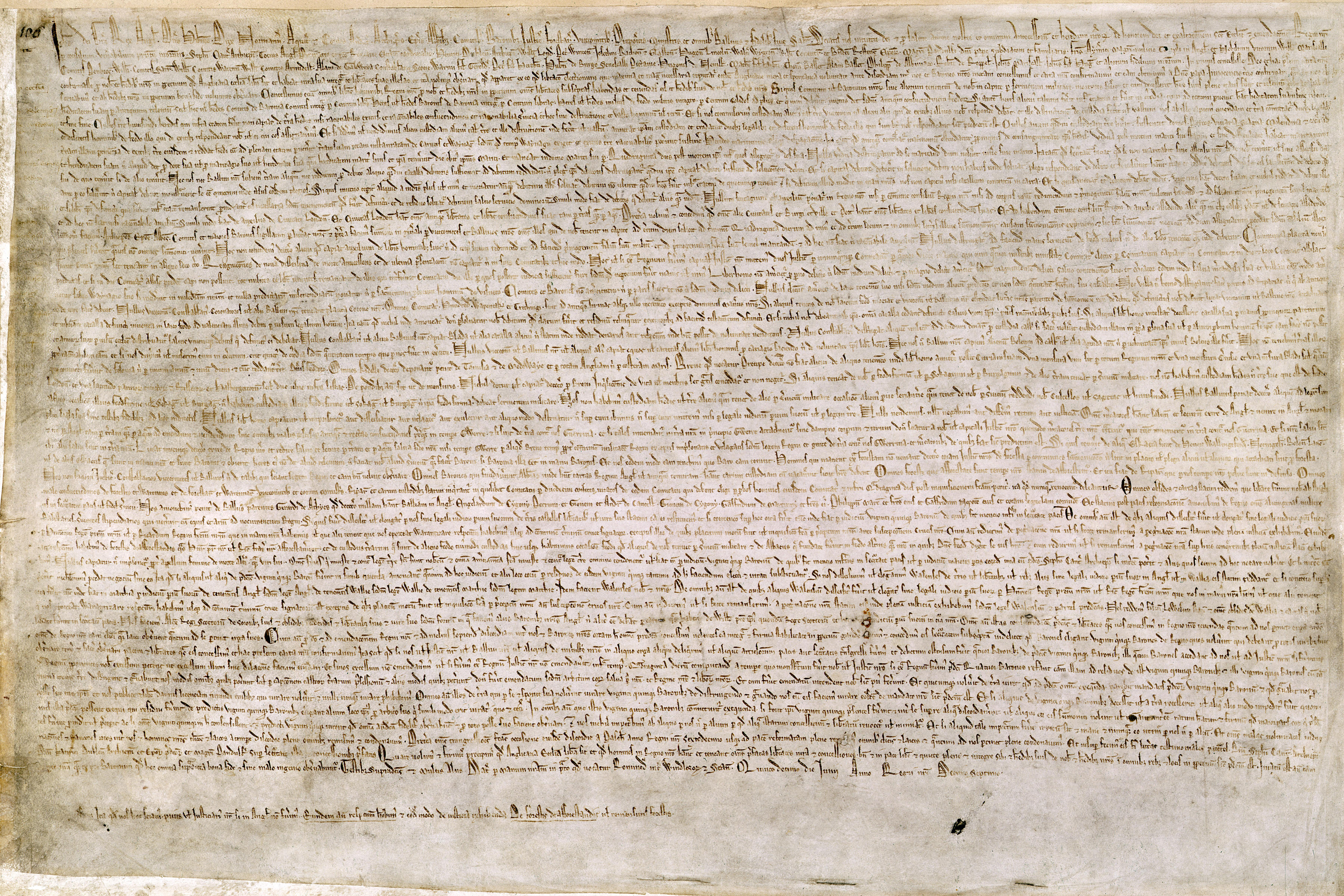
Magna Carta, 1215, England

The Parliament of England had its roots in the restrictions on the power of kings written into Magna Carta (1215), which explicitly protected certain rights of the King's subjects and implicitly supported what became the English writ of habeas corpus, safeguarding individual freedom against unlawful imprisonment with the right to appeal. The first representative national assembly in England was Simon de Montfort's Parliament in 1265. The emergence of petitioning is some of the earliest evidence of parliament being used as a forum to address the general grievances of ordinary people. However, the power to call parliament remained at the pleasure of the monarch.

Studies have linked the emergence of parliamentary institutions in Europe during the medieval period to urban agglomeration and the creation of new classes, such as artisans, as well as the presence of nobility and religious elites. Scholars have also linked the emergence of representative government to Europe's relative political fragmentation. Political scientist David Stasavage links the fragmentation of Europe, and its subsequent democratization, to the manner in which the Roman Empire collapsed: Roman territory was conquered by small fragmented groups of Germanic tribes, thus leading to the creation of small political units where rulers were relatively weak and needed the consent of the governed to ward off foreign threats.

In Poland, noble democracy was characterized by an increase in the activity of the middle nobility, which wanted to increase their share in exercising power at the expense of the magnates. Magnates dominated the most important offices in the state (secular and ecclesiastical) and sat on the royal council, later the senate. The growing importance of the middle nobility had an impact on the establishment of the institution of the land sejmik (local assembly), which subsequently obtained more rights. During the fifteenth and first half of the sixteenth century, sejmiks received more and more power and became the most important institutions of local power. In 1454, Casimir IV Jagiellon granted the sejmiks the right to decide on taxes and to convene a mass mobilization in the Nieszawa Statutes. He also pledged not to create new laws without their consent.

=== Modern era ===
==== Early modern period ====
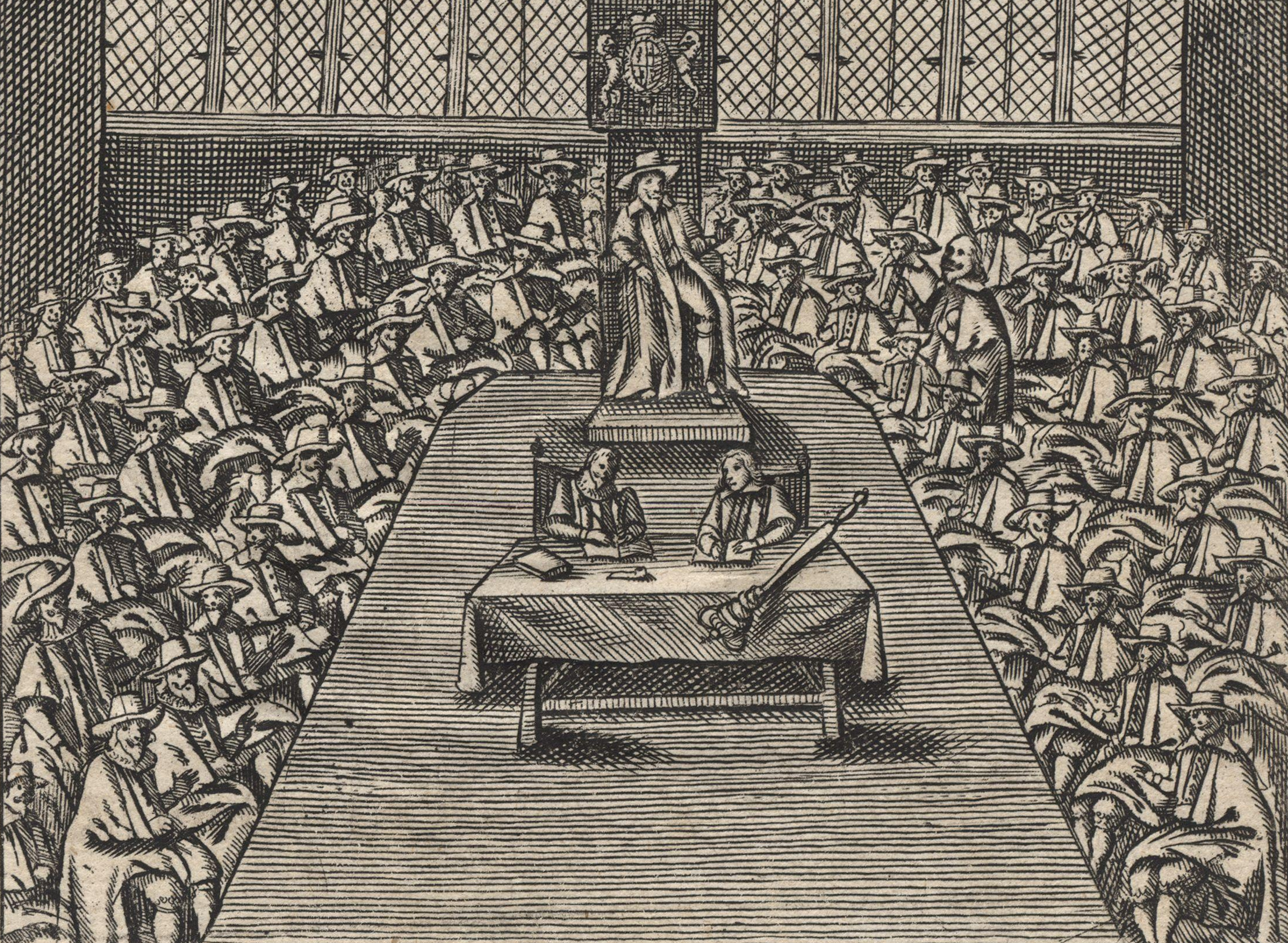
Over the centuries, the English Parliament progressively limited the power of the English monarchy, a process that arguably culminated in the English Civil War.

In 17th century England, there was renewed interest in Magna Carta. The Parliament of England passed the Petition of Right in 1628 which established certain liberties for subjects. The English Civil War (1642–1651) was fought between the King and an oligarchic but elected Parliament, during which the idea of a political party took form with groups debating rights to political representation during the Putney Debates of 1647. Subsequently, the Protectorate (1653–59) and the English Restoration (1660) restored more autocratic rule, although Parliament passed the Habeas Corpus Act in 1679 which strengthened the convention that forbade detention lacking sufficient cause or evidence. After the Glorious Revolution of 1688, the Bill of Rights was enacted in 1689 which codified certain rights and liberties and is still in effect. The Bill set out the requirement for regular elections, rules for freedom of speech in Parliament and limited the power of the monarch, ensuring that, unlike much of Europe at the time, royal absolutism would not prevail. Economic historians Douglass North and Barry Weingast have characterized the institutions implemented in the Glorious Revolution as a resounding success in terms of restraining the government and ensuring protection for property rights.

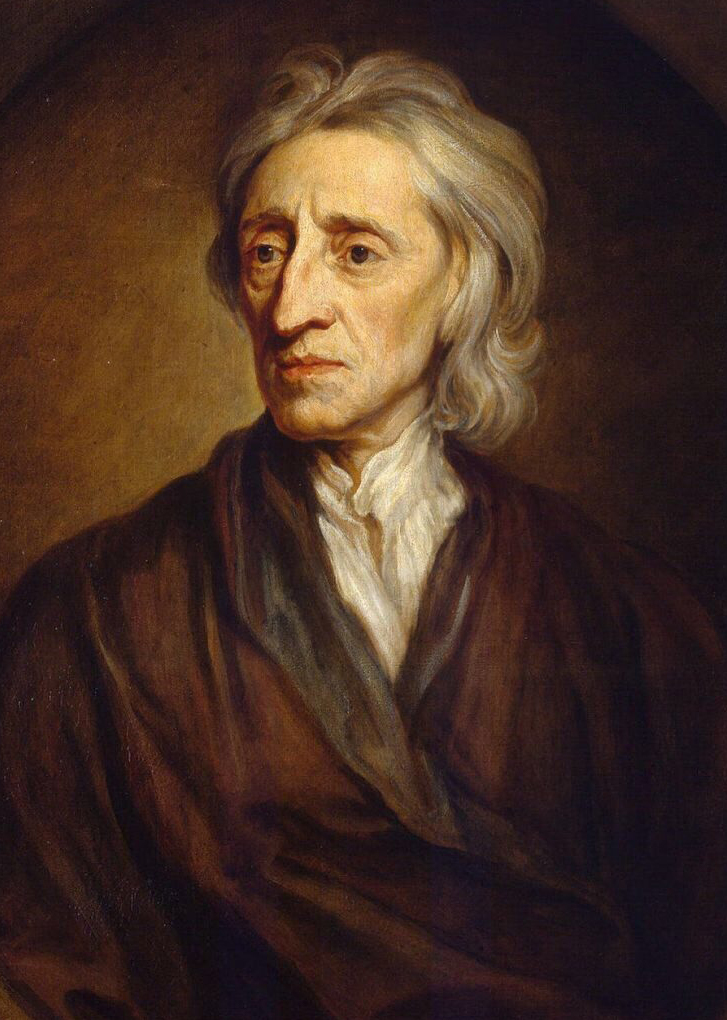
John Locke expanded on Thomas Hobbes's social contract theory and developed the concept of natural rights, the right to private property and the principle of consent of the governed. His ideas form the ideological basis of liberal democracies today.

Renewed interest in the Magna Carta, the English Civil War, and the Glorious Revolution in the 17th century prompted the growth of political philosophy on the British Isles. Thomas Hobbes was the first philosopher to articulate a detailed social contract theory. Writing in the Leviathan (1651), Hobbes theorized that individuals living in the state of nature led lives that were "solitary, poor, nasty, brutish and short" and constantly waged a war of all against all. In order to prevent the occurrence of an anarchic state of nature, Hobbes reasoned that individuals ceded their rights to a strong, authoritarian power. In other words, Hobbes advocated for an absolute monarchy which, in his opinion, was the best form of government. Later, philosopher and physician John Locke would posit a different interpretation of social contract theory. Writing in his Two Treatises of Government (1689), Locke posited that all individuals possessed the inalienable rights to life, liberty and estate (property). According to Locke, individuals would voluntarily come together to form a state for the purposes of defending their rights. Particularly important for Locke were property rights, whose protection Locke deemed to be a government's primary purpose. Furthermore, Locke asserted that governments were legitimate only if they held the consent of the governed. For Locke, citizens had the right to revolt against a government that acted against their interest or became tyrannical. Although they were not widely read during his lifetime, Locke's works are considered the founding documents of liberal thought and profoundly influenced the leaders of the American Revolution and later the French Revolution. His liberal democratic framework of governance remains the preeminent form of democracy in the world.

In North America, representative government began in Jamestown, Virginia, with the election of the House of Burgesses (forerunner of the Virginia General Assembly) in 1619. English Puritans who migrated from 1620 established colonies in New England whose local governance was democratic; the hard power of these local assemblies varied greatly throughout the colonial time period however officially they held only small amounts of devolved power, as ultimate authority belonged to the Crown and Parliament. The Puritans (Pilgrim Fathers), Baptists, and Quakers who founded these colonies applied the democratic organisation of their congregations also to the administration of their communities in worldly matters.

==== 18th and 19th centuries ====
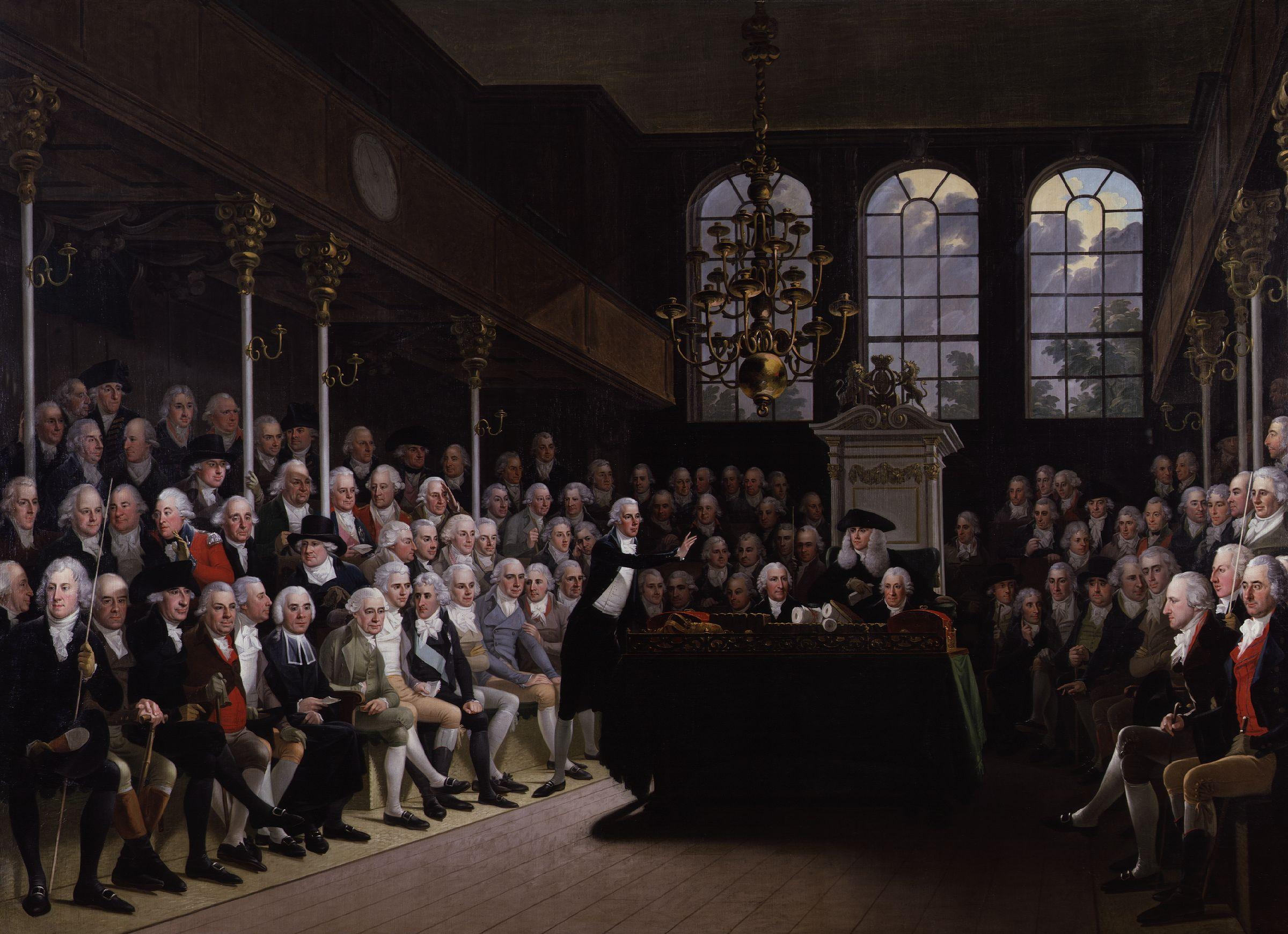
William Pitt the Younger addressing the House of Commons of the United Kingdom

The first Parliament of Great Britain was established in 1707, after the merger of the Kingdom of England and the Kingdom of Scotland under the Acts of Union. Two key documents of the UK's uncodified constitution, the English Declaration of Right, 1689 (restated in the Bill of Rights 1689) and the Scottish Claim of Right 1689, had both cemented Parliament's position as the supreme law-making body and said that the "election of members of Parliament ought to be free". However, Parliament was only elected by male property owners, which amounted to 3% of the population in 1780. The first known British person of African heritage to vote in a general election, Ignatius Sancho, voted in 1774 and 1780.

During the Age of Liberty in Sweden (1718–1772), civil rights were expanded and power shifted from the monarch to parliament. The taxed peasantry was represented in parliament, although with little influence, but commoners without taxed property had no suffrage.

The creation of the short-lived Corsican Republic in 1755 was an early attempt to adopt a democratic constitution (all men and women above age of 25 could vote). This Corsican Constitution was the first based on Enlightenment principles and included female suffrage, something that was not included in most other democracies until the 20th century.

The Thirteen British Colonies on the east coast of North America issued a Declaration of Independence in 1776

Colonial America had similar property qualifications as Britain, and in the period before 1776 the abundance and availability of land meant that large numbers of colonists met such requirements with at least 60 per cent of adult white males able to vote. The great majority of white men were farmers who met the property ownership or taxpaying requirements. With few exceptions, no blacks or women could vote. Vermont, which, on declaring independence of Great Britain in 1777, adopted a constitution modelled on Pennsylvania's citizenship and democratic suffrage for males with or without property. The United States Constitution of 1787 is the oldest surviving, still active, governmental codified constitution. The Constitution provided for an elected government and protected civil rights and liberties, but did not end slavery nor extend voting rights in the United States, instead leaving the issue of suffrage to the individual states. Generally, states limited suffrage to white male property owners and taxpayers. At the time of the first Presidential election in 1789, about 6% of the population was eligible to vote. The Naturalization Act of 1790 limited U.S. citizenship to whites only. The Bill of Rights in 1791 set limits on government power to protect personal freedoms but had little impact on judgements by the courts for the first 130 years after ratification.

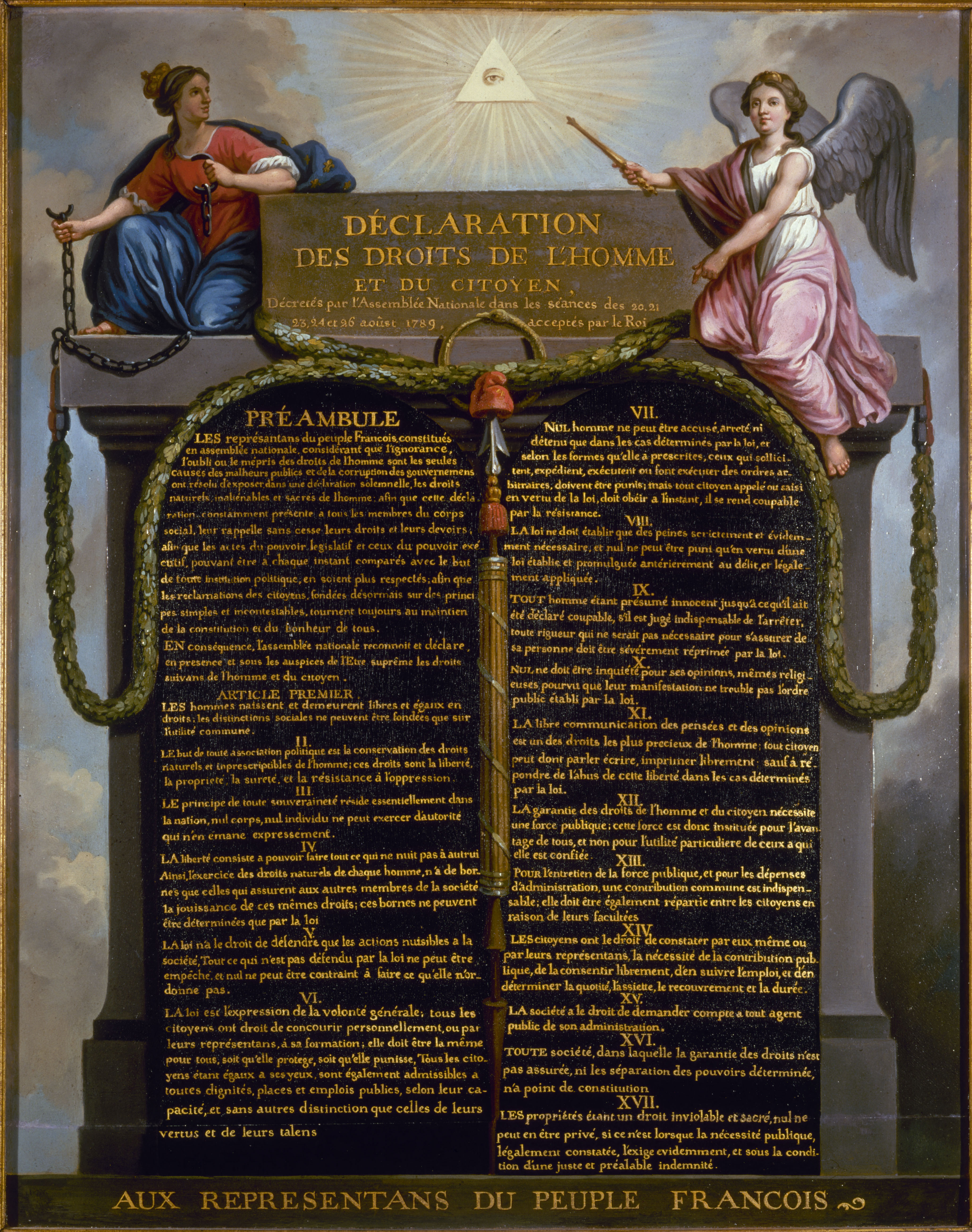
Inspired by Enlightenment philosophers, the Declaration of the Rights of Man and of the Citizen had a significant impact on the development of popular conceptions of individual liberty and democracy in Europe and worldwide.

In 1789, Revolutionary France adopted the Declaration of the Rights of Man and of the Citizen and, although short-lived, the National Convention was elected by all men in 1792. The Polish-Lithuanian Constitution of 3 May 1791 sought to implement a more effective constitutional monarchy, introduced political equality between townspeople and nobility, and placed the peasants under the protection of the government, mitigating the worst abuses of serfdom. In force for less than 19 months, it was declared null and void by the Grodno Sejm that met in 1793. Nonetheless, the 1791 Constitution helped keep alive Polish aspirations for the eventual restoration of the country's sovereignty over a century later.

In the United States, the 1828 presidential election was the first in which non-property-holding white males could vote in the vast majority of states. Voter turnout soared during the 1830s, reaching about 80% of the adult white male population in the 1840 presidential election. North Carolina was the last state to abolish property qualification in 1856 resulting in a close approximation to universal white male suffrage (however tax-paying requirements remained in five states in 1860 and survived in two states until the 20th century). In the 1860 United States census, the slave population had grown to four million, and in Reconstruction after the Civil War, three constitutional amendments were passed: the 13th Amendment (1865) that ended slavery; the 14th Amendment (1869) that gave black people citizenship, and the 15th Amendment (1870) that gave black males a nominal right to vote. (Note: The Fourteenth Amendment to the United States Constitution in 1868 altered the way each state is represented in the House of Representatives. It counted all residents for apportionment including slaves, overriding the three-fifths compromise, and reduced a state's apportionment if it wrongfully denied males over the age of 21 the right to vote; however, this was not enforced in practice. Some poor white men remained excluded at least until the passage of the Voting Rights Act of 1965. For state elections, it was not until the U.S. Supreme Court ruled 6–3 in Harper v. Virginia Board of Elections (1966) that all state poll taxes were unconstitutional as violating the Equal Protection Clause of the Fourteenth Amendment. This removed a burden on the poor.) Full enfranchisement of citizens was not secured until after the civil rights movement gained passage by the US Congress of the Voting Rights Act of 1965.

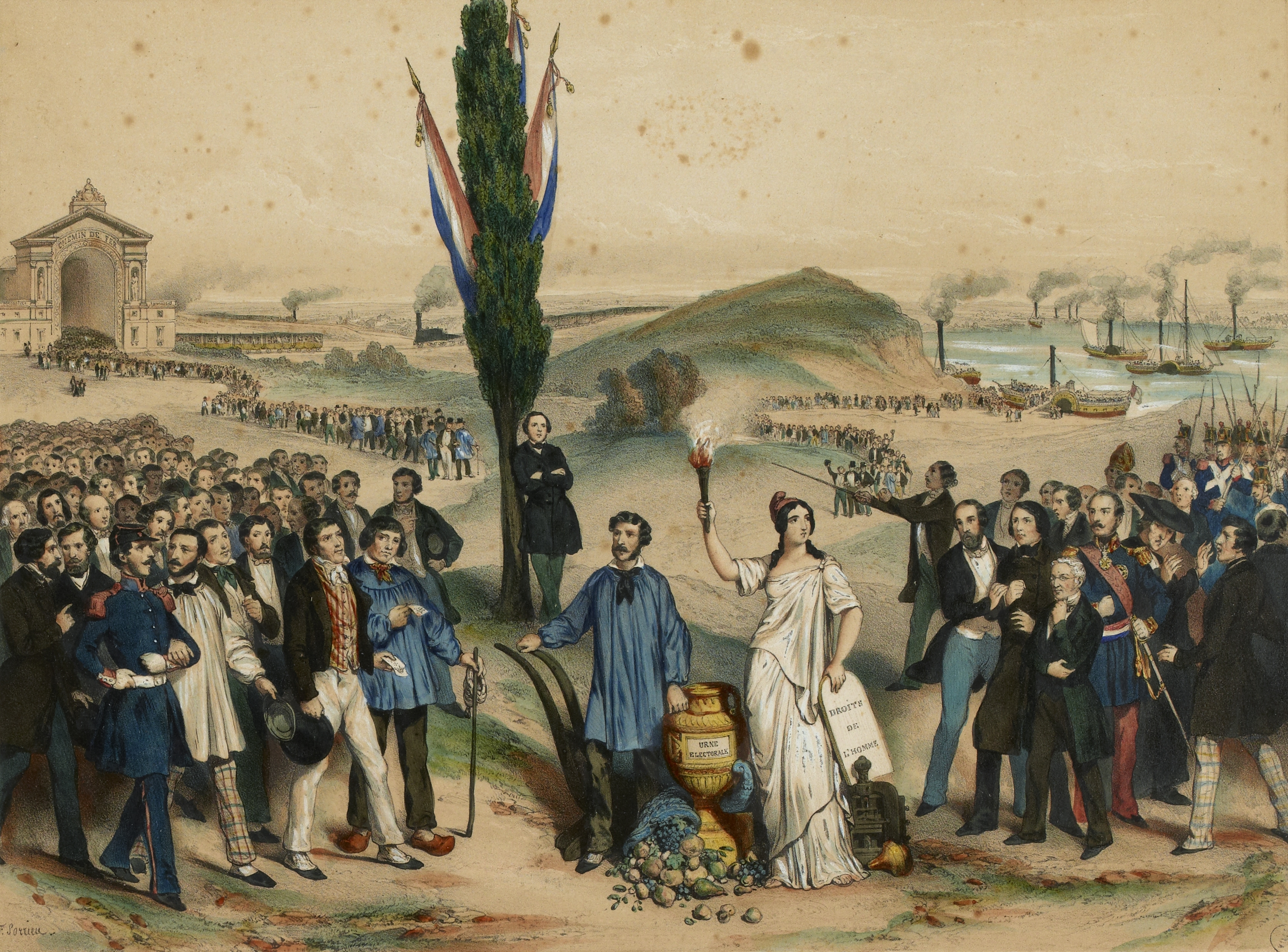
1850s lithograph marking the establishment of universal male suffrage in France in 1848

The voting franchise in the United Kingdom was expanded and made more uniform in a series of reforms that began with the Reform Act 1832 and continued into the 20th century, notably with the Representation of the People Act 1918 and the Equal Franchise Act 1928. Universal male suffrage was established in France in March 1848 in the wake of the French Revolution of 1848. During that year, several revolutions broke out in Europe as rulers were confronted with popular demands for liberal constitutions and more democratic government.

In 1876, the Ottoman Empire transitioned from an absolute monarchy to a constitutional one, and held two elections the next year to elect members to her newly formed parliament. Provisional Electoral Regulations were issued, stating that the elected members of the Provincial Administrative Councils would elect members to the first Parliament. Later that year, a new constitution was promulgated, which provided for a bicameral Parliament with a Senate appointed by the Sultan and a popularly elected Chamber of Deputies. Only men above the age of 30 who were competent in Turkish and had full civil rights were allowed to stand for election. Reasons for disqualification included holding dual citizenship, being employed by a foreign government, being bankrupt, employed as a servant, or having "notoriety for ill deeds". Full universal suffrage was achieved in 1934.

In 1893, the self-governing colony New Zealand became the first country in the world (except for the short-lived 18th-century Corsican Republic) to establish active universal suffrage by recognizing women as having the right to vote.

==== 20th and 21st centuries ====
The number of nations 1800–2018 scoring 8 or higher on Polity5 scale, another widely used measure of democracy

20th-century transitions to liberal democracy have come in successive "waves of democracy", variously resulting from wars, revolutions, decolonisation, and religious and economic circumstances. Global waves of "democratic regression" reversing democratization, have also occurred in the 1920s and 30s, in the 1960s and 1970s, and in the 2010s.

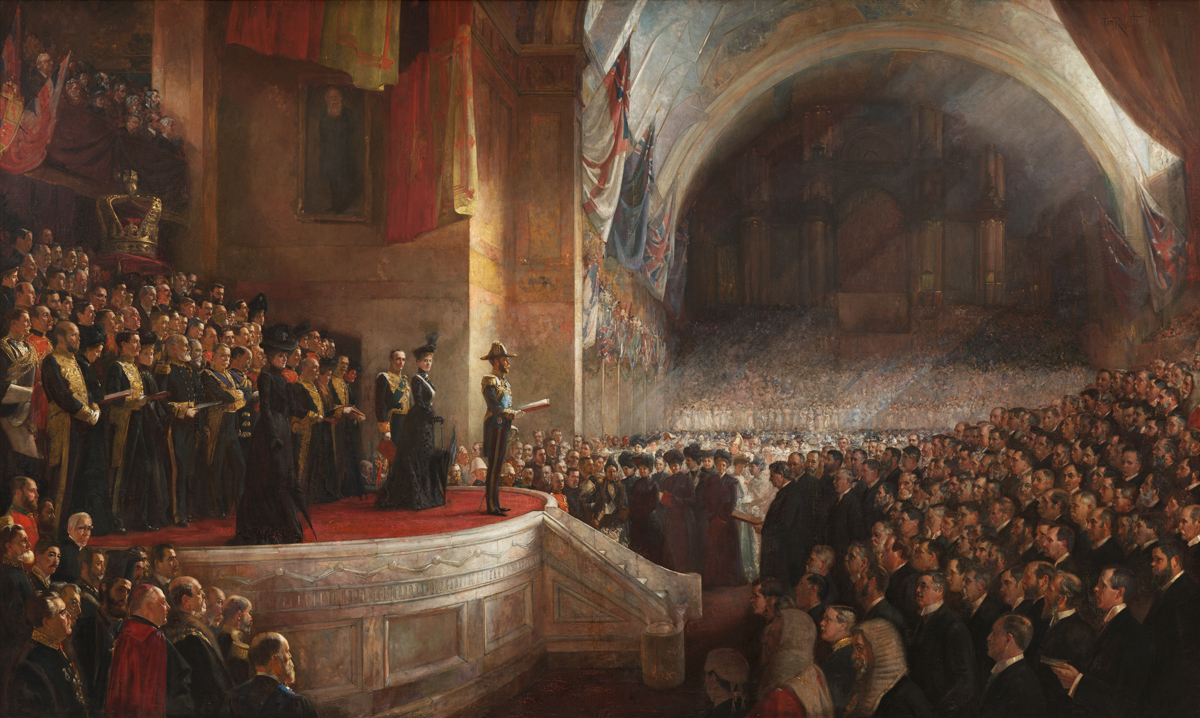
Painting depicting the opening of the first Australian Parliament in 1901, one of the events that formed part of the first wave of democracy in the early 20th century

World War I and the dissolution of the autocratic Ottoman and Austro-Hungarian empires resulted in the creation of new nation-states in Europe, most of them at least nominally democratic. In the 1920s democratic movements flourished and women's suffrage advanced, but the Great Depression brought disenchantment and most of the countries of Europe, Latin America, and Asia turned to strong-man rule or dictatorships. Fascism and dictatorships flourished in Nazi Germany, Italy, Spain and Portugal, as well as non-democratic governments in the Baltics, the Balkans, Brazil, Cuba, China, and Japan, among others.

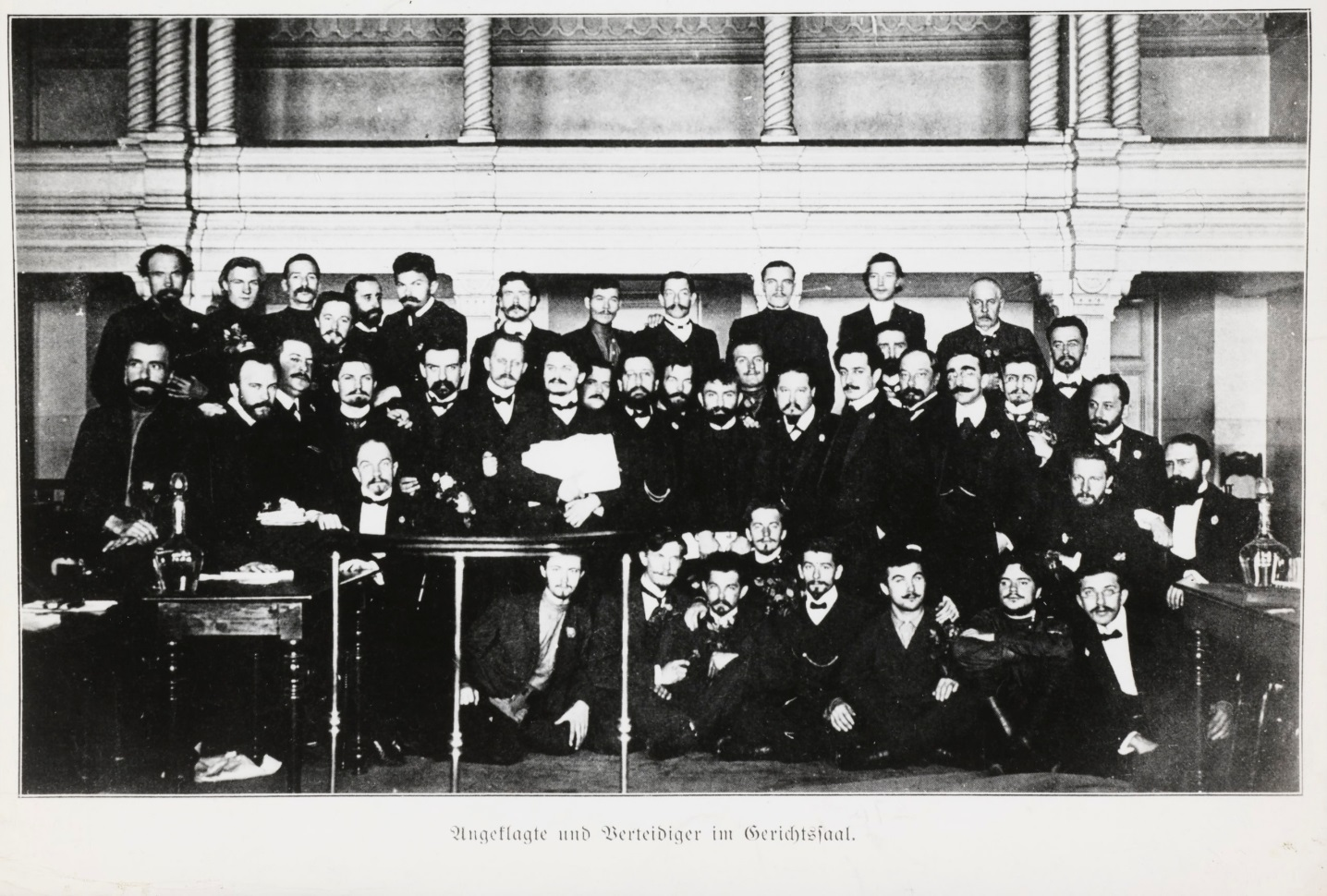
The Soviet of Workers' Deputies of Saint Petersburg in 1905: Leon Trotsky in the center. The soviets were as an early example of a workers council.

World War II brought a definitive reversal of this trend in Western Europe. The democratisation of the American, British, and French sectors of occupied Germany (disputed), Austria, Italy, and the occupied Japan served as a model for the later theory of government change. However, most of Eastern Europe, including the Soviet sector of Germany fell into the non-democratic Soviet-dominated bloc.

The war was followed by decolonisation, and again most of the new independent states had nominally democratic constitutions. India emerged as the world's largest democracy and continues to be so. Countries that were once part of the British Empire often adopted the British Westminster system.

In 1948, the Universal Declaration of Human Rights mandated democracy:

3. The will of the people shall be the basis of the authority of government; this will shall be expressed in periodic and genuine elections which shall be by universal and equal suffrage and shall be held by secret vote or by equivalent free voting procedures.

— Universal Declaration of Human Rights, Article 21, United Nations, 1948

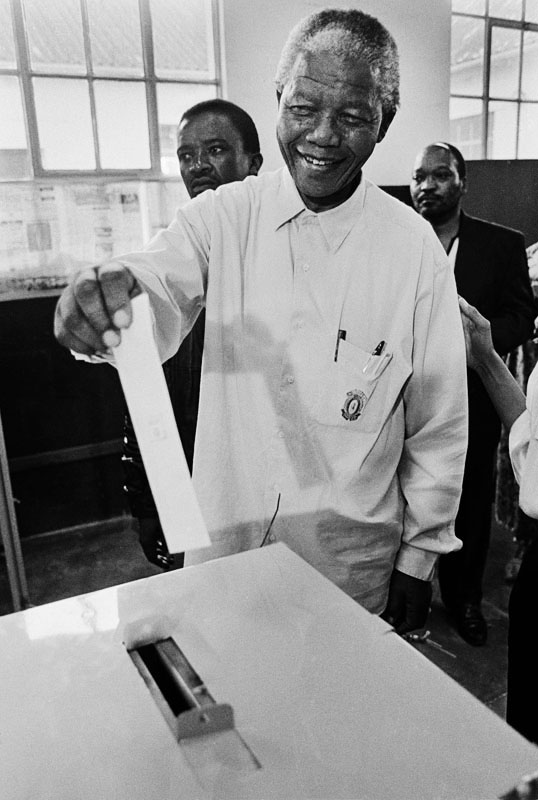
Nelson Mandela voting in the 1994 multi-racial elections in South Africa. It was the first time he had voted in his life.

By 1960, the vast majority of country-states were nominally democracies, although most of the world's populations lived in nominal democracies that experienced sham elections, and other forms of subterfuge (particularly in socialist states and the former colonies). A subsequent wave of democratisation brought substantial gains toward true liberal democracy for many states, dubbed "third wave of democracy". Portugal, Spain, and several of the military dictatorships in South America returned to civilian rule in the 1970s and 1980s. (Note: Portugal in 1974, Spain in 1975, Argentina in 1983, Bolivia, Uruguay in 1984, Brazil in 1985, and Chile in the early 1990s) This was followed by countries in East and South Asia by the mid-to-late 1980s. Economic malaise in the 1980s, along with resentment of Soviet oppression, contributed to the collapse of the Soviet Union, the associated end of the Cold War, and the democratisation and liberalisation of the former Eastern bloc countries. The most successful of the new democracies were those geographically and culturally closest to western Europe, and they are now either part of the European Union or candidate states. In 1986, after the toppling of the most prominent Asian dictatorship, the only democratic state of its kind at the time emerged in the Philippines with the rise of Corazon Aquino, who would later be known as the mother of Asian democracy.

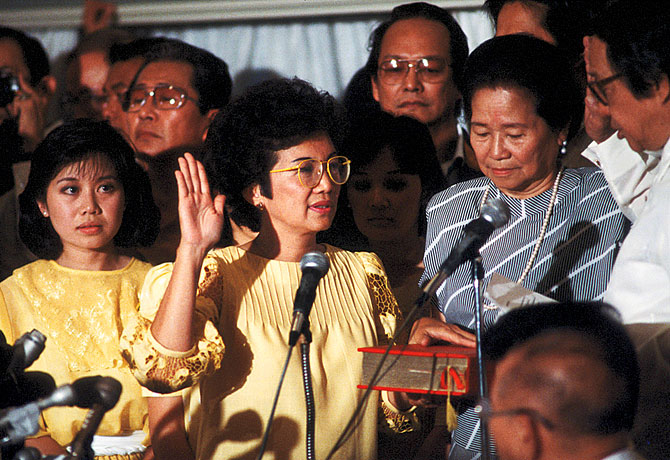
Corazon Aquino taking the oath of office, becoming the first female president in Asia

The liberal trend spread to some states in Africa in the 1990s, most prominently in South Africa. Some recent examples of attempts of liberalisation include the Indonesian Revolution of 1998, the Bulldozer Revolution in Yugoslavia, the Rose Revolution in Georgia, the Orange Revolution in Ukraine, the Cedar Revolution in Lebanon, the Tulip Revolution in Kyrgyzstan, and the Jasmine Revolution in Tunisia.

Age of democracies at the end of 2015

According to Freedom House, in 2007 there were 123 electoral democracies (up from 40 in 1972). According to World Forum on Democracy, electoral democracies now represent 120 of the 192 existing countries and constitute 58.2 per cent of the world's population. At the same time liberal democracies i.e. countries Freedom House regards as free and respectful of basic human rights and the rule of law are 85 in number and represent 38 per cent of the global population. Also in 2007 the United Nations declared 15 September the International Day of Democracy.

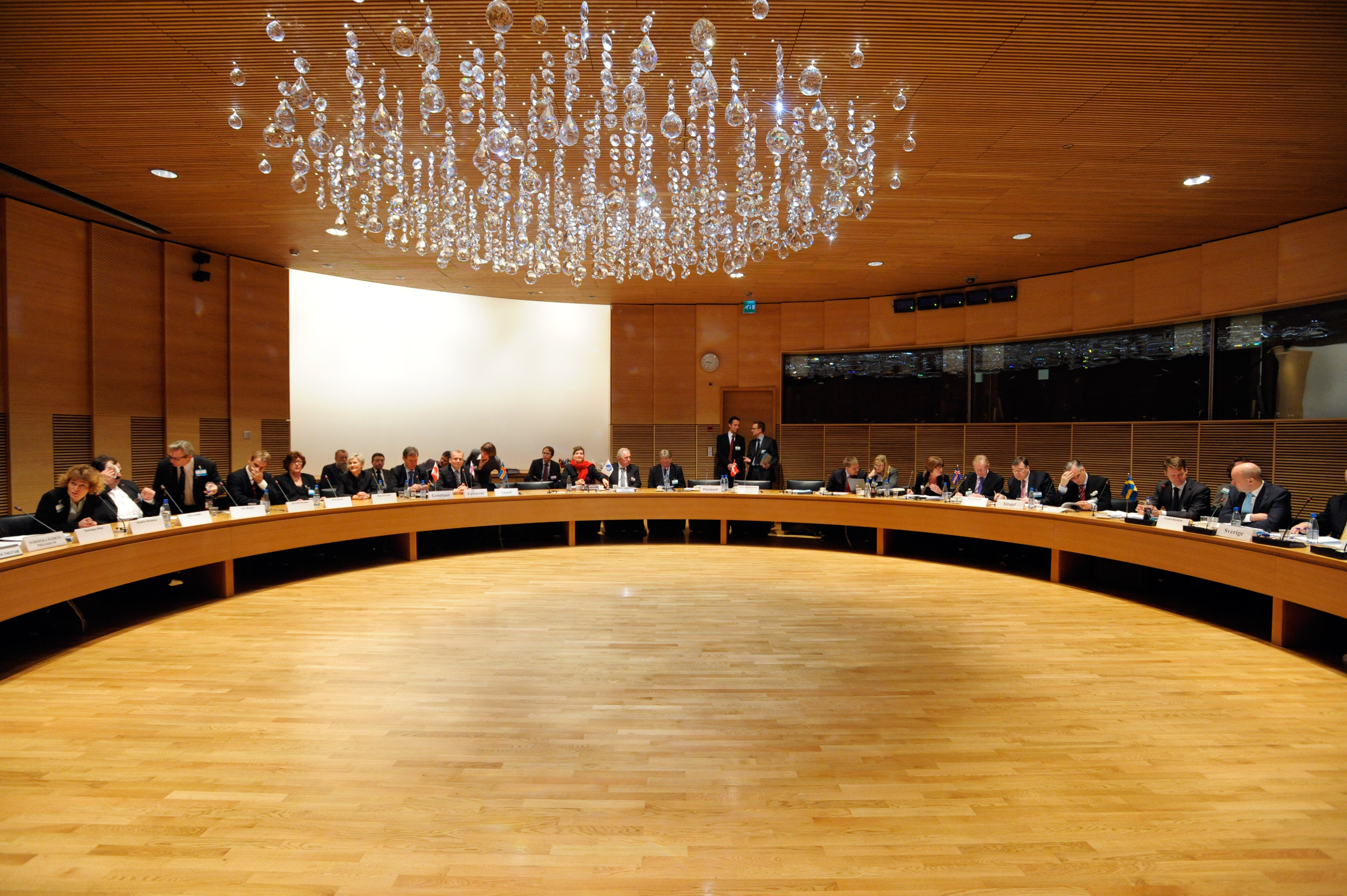
Meeting of the Grand Committee of the Parliament of Finland in 2008

Many countries reduced their voting age to 18 years; the major democracies began to do so in the 1970s starting in Western Europe and North America. Most electoral democracies continue to exclude those younger than 18 from voting. The voting age has been lowered to 16 for national elections in a number of countries, including Brazil, Austria, Cuba, and Nicaragua. In California, a 2004 proposal to permit a quarter vote at 14 and a half vote at 16 was ultimately defeated. In 2008, the German parliament proposed but shelved a bill that would grant the vote to each citizen at birth, to be used by a parent until the child claims it for themselves.

According to Freedom House, starting in 2005, there have been 17 consecutive years in which declines in political rights and civil liberties throughout the world have outnumbered improvements, as populist and nationalist political forces have gained ground everywhere from Poland (under the Law and Justice party) to the Philippines (under Rodrigo Duterte). In a Freedom House report released in 2018, Democracy Scores for most countries declined for the 12th consecutive year. The Christian Science Monitor reported that nationalist and populist political ideologies were gaining ground, at the expense of rule of law, in countries like Poland, Turkey and Hungary. For example, in Poland, the President appointed 27 new Supreme Court judges over legal objections from the European Commission. In Turkey, thousands of judges were removed from their positions following a failed coup attempt during a government crackdown.

Countries autocratising (red) or democratising (blue) substantially and significantly (2010–2020). Countries in grey are substantially unchanged.

Green: countries that claim to be a democracy Red: countries that do not claim to be democratic (only Saudi Arabia, Oman, the UAE, Qatar, Brunei, Afghanistan, Burkina Faso and the Vatican do not claim to be democratic as of 2026; Burkina Faso dissolved all political parties in 2026)

"Democratic backsliding" in the 2010s were attributed to economic inequality and social discontent, personalism, poor government's management of the COVID-19 pandemic, as well as other factors such as manipulation of civil society, "toxic polarization", foreign disinformation campaigns, racism and nativism, excessive executive power, and decreased power of the opposition. Within English-speaking Western democracies, "protection-based" attitudes combining cultural conservatism and leftist economic attitudes were the strongest predictor of support for authoritarian modes of governance.

== Theory ==
=== Early theory ===
Aristotle's democratic theory contrasted rule by the many (democracy/timocracy), with rule by the few (oligarchy/aristocracy/elitism), and with rule by a single person (tyranny/autocracy/absolute monarchy). He also thought that there was a good and a bad variant of each system (he considered democracy to be the degenerate counterpart to timocracy).

A common view among early and renaissance Republican theorists was that democracy could only survive in small political communities. Heeding the lessons of the Roman Republic's shift to monarchism as it grew larger or smaller, these Republican theorists held that the expansion of territory and population inevitably led to tyranny. Democracy was therefore highly fragile and rare historically, as it could only survive in small political units, which due to their size were vulnerable to conquest by larger political units. Montesquieu famously said, "if a republic is small, it is destroyed by an outside force; if it is large, it is destroyed by an internal vice." Jean-Jacques Rousseau asserted, "It is, therefore the natural property of small states to be governed as a republic, of middling ones to be subject to a monarch, and of large empires to be swayed by a despotic prince."

=== Contemporary theory ===
Among modern political theorists, there are different fundamental conceptions of democracy.

==== Aggregation ====
The theory of aggregative democracy claims that the aim of the democratic processes is to solicit citizens' preferences and aggregate them together to determine what social policies society should adopt. Therefore, proponents of this view hold that democratic participation should primarily focus on voting, where the policy with the most votes gets implemented. Different variants of aggregative democracy exist.

According to the minimalist democracy conception, elections are a mechanism for competition between politicians. Joseph Schumpeter articulated this view famously in his book Capitalism, Socialism, and Democracy.

Anthony Downs argues that ideological political parties are necessary to act as a mediating broker between individuals and governments. On the other hand, direct democracy, where citizens vote directly on legislative proposals, can show better aggregation in cases of differences in preferences between elites and voters.

===== Median mandate =====
According to the median voter theorem the political representativeness can be evaluated by comparing how close laws and policies are to the views of the median voter along the political spectrum. The median mandate views the preferences of the median voter as granting political legitimacy.

==== Polyarchy ====
Robert A. Dahl argues that the fundamental democratic principle is that, when it comes to binding collective decisions, each person in a political community is entitled to have his/her interests be given equal consideration. He uses the term polyarchy ("rule by many") to refer to societies in which there exists a certain set of institutions and procedures which are perceived as leading to such democracy. First and foremost among these institutions is the regular occurrence of free and open elections which are used to select representatives who then manage all or most of the public policy of the society. However, these polyarchic procedures may not create a full democracy if, for example, poverty prevents political participation. Similarly, Ronald Dworkin argues that "democracy is a substantive, not a merely procedural, ideal."

==== Deliberation ====
Deliberative democracy is based on the notion that democracy is government by deliberation. Unlike aggregative democracy, deliberative democracy holds that, for a democratic decision to be legitimate, it must be preceded by authentic deliberation, not merely the aggregation of preferences that occurs in voting. Authentic deliberation is deliberation among decision-makers that is free from distortions of unequal political power, such as power a decision-maker obtained through economic wealth or the support of interest groups. If the decision-makers cannot reach consensus after authentically deliberating on a proposal, then they vote on the proposal using a form of majority rule. Citizens assemblies are considered by many scholars as practical examples of deliberative democracy, with a recent OECD report identifying citizens assemblies as an increasingly popular mechanism to involve citizens in governmental decision-making. Proponents of direct democracy view citizens do not rule themselves unless they directly decide laws and policies. Political activity can be valuable in itself, it socialises and educates citizens, and popular participation can check powerful elites.

==== Types of governmental democracies ====
World's states colored by systems of government: Parliamentary systems: Head of government is elected or nominated by and accountable to the legislature. Constitutional monarchy with a ceremonial monarch Semi-constitutional monarchy: Monarch holds significant executive or legislative power but is still restricted by the constitution. Parliamentary republic with a ceremonial president Parliamentary republic with an executive president Presidential system: Head of government (president) is popularly elected and independent of the legislature. Presidential republic Theocratic presidential republic: Supreme leader is highest authority; popularly elected president still exists. Hybrid systems: Semi-presidential republic: Executive president is independent of the legislature; head of government is appointed by the president and is accountable to the legislature. Assembly-independent republic: Head of government (president or directory) is elected by the legislature, but is not accountable to it. Other systems: Islamic theocracy: Supreme leader holds unlimited political and religious power; state and faith are a single institution. Absolute monarchy: Monarch has unlimited power. One-party state: Power is constitutionally linked to a single political party. Provisional government: Current regime is temporary or transitional; no permanent constitution. Military junta: Committee of military leaders controls the government; constitutional provisions are suspended. Places without governments. Note: this chart represents the de jure systems of government, not the de facto degree of democracy.

Democracy has taken a number of forms, both in theory and practice. Some varieties of democracy provide better representation and more freedom for their citizens than others. However, if any democracy is not structured to prohibit the government from excluding the people from the legislative process, or any branch of government from altering the separation of powers in its favour, then a branch of the system can accumulate too much power and destroy the democracy.

The following kinds of democracy are not exclusive of one another: many specify details of aspects that are independent of one another and can co-exist in a single system.

===== Basic forms =====
Several variants of democracy exist, but there are two basic forms, both of which concern how the whole body of all eligible citizens executes its will. One form of democracy is direct democracy, in which all eligible citizens have active participation in the political decision making, for example voting on policy initiatives directly. In most modern democracies, the whole body of eligible citizens remain the sovereign power but political power is exercised indirectly through elected representatives; this is called a representative democracy.

If the head of state is democratically elected then the polity is called a democratic republic

====== Direct ======
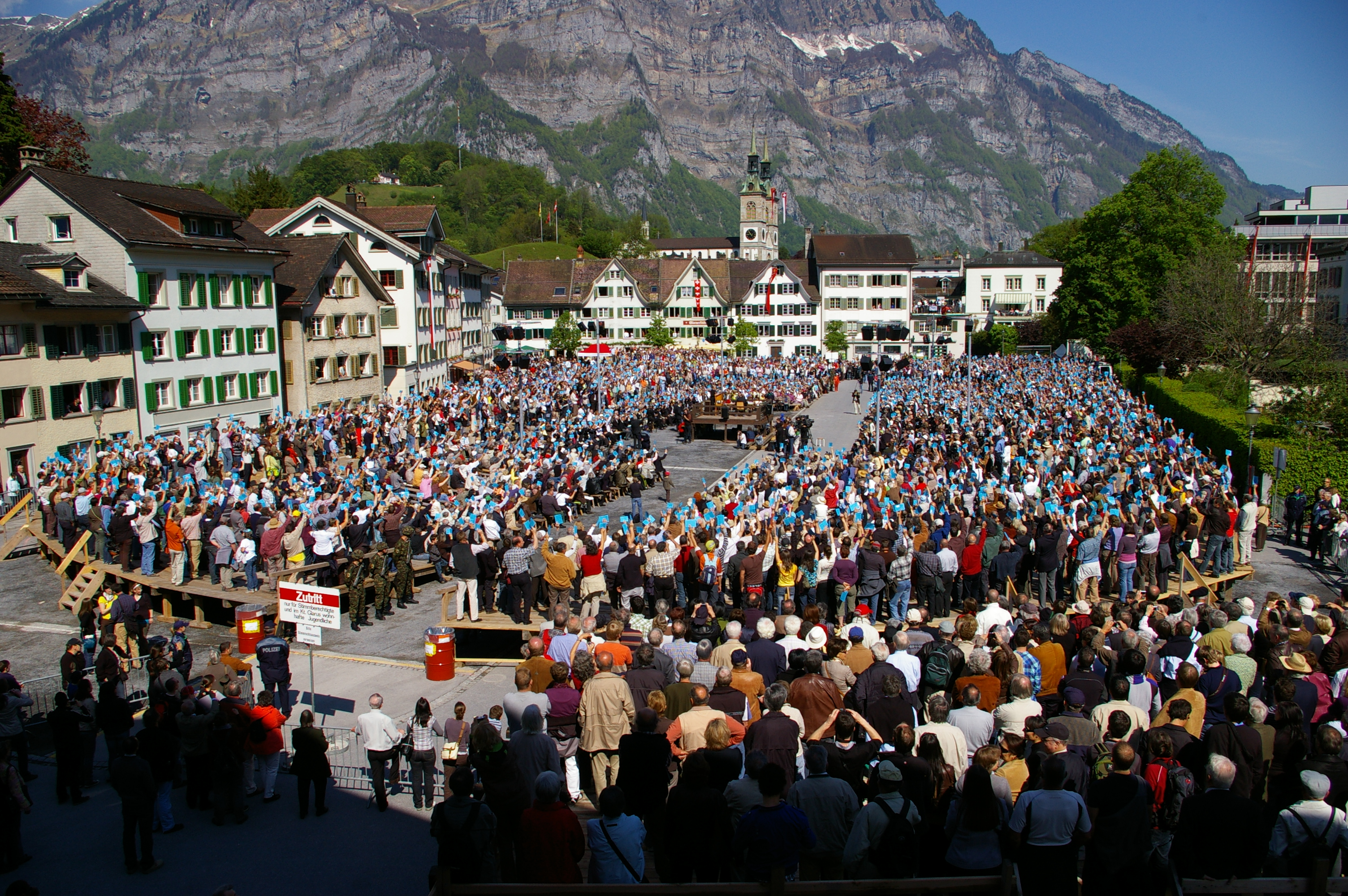
A Landsgemeinde (in 2009) of the canton of Glarus, an example of direct democracy in Switzerland

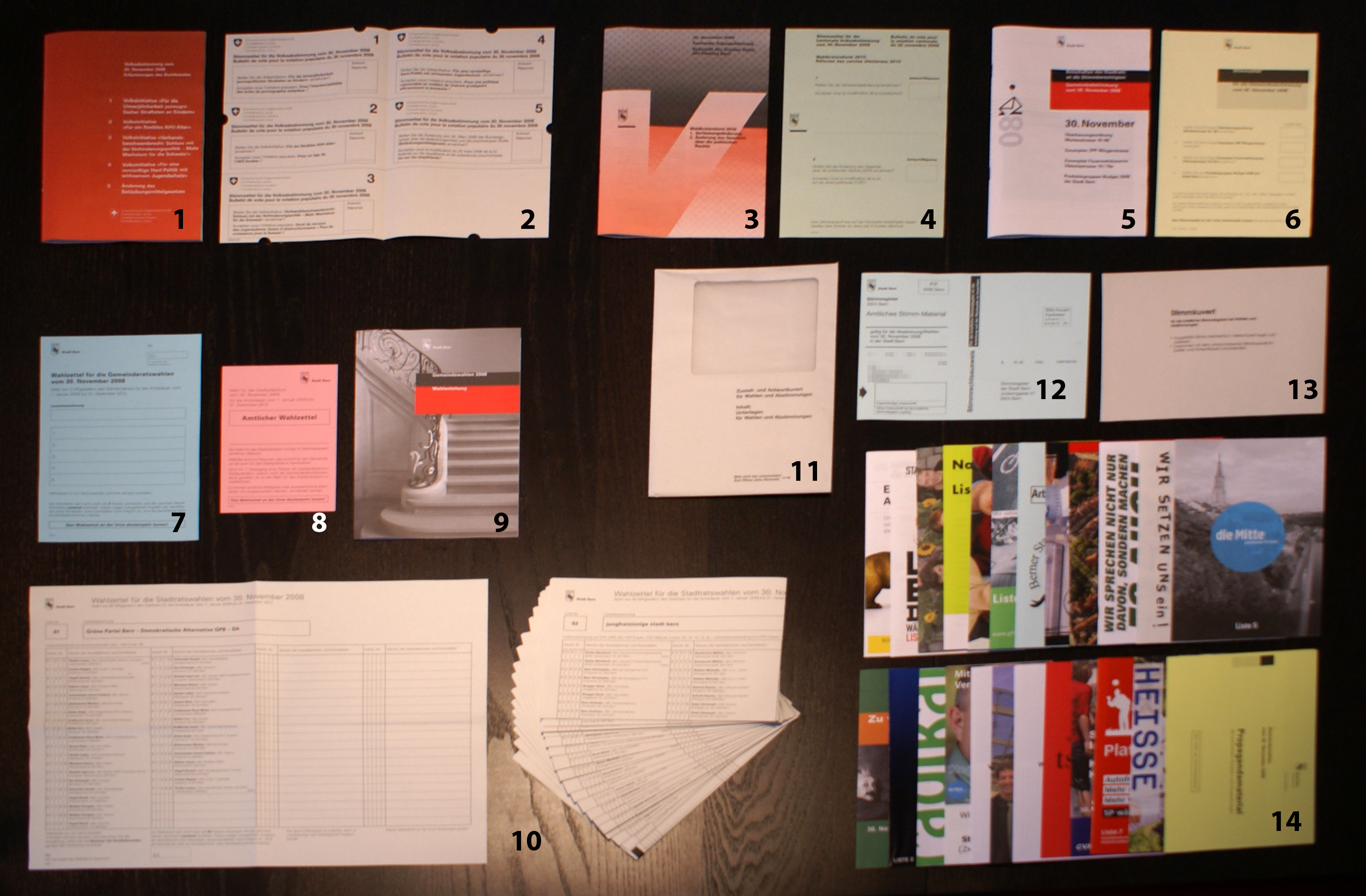
In Switzerland, without needing to register, every citizen receives ballot papers and information brochures for each vote (and can send it back by post). Switzerland has a direct democracy system and votes (and elections) are organised about four times a year; here, to Berne's citizen in November 2008 about 5 national, 2 cantonal, 4 municipal referendums, and 2 elections (government and parliament of the City of Berne) to take care of at the same time.

Direct democracy is a political system where the citizens participate in the decision-making personally, contrary to relying on intermediaries or representatives. Proponents like Jean-Jacques Rousseau argue the direct approach increases legitimacy. A direct democracy gives the voting population the power to:

- Change constitutional laws,
- Put forth initiatives, referendums and suggestions for laws

Within modern-day representative governments, certain electoral tools like referendums, citizens' initiatives and recall elections are referred to as forms of direct democracy. However, some advocates of direct democracy argue for local assemblies of face-to-face discussion. Direct democracy as a government system currently exists in the Swiss cantons of Appenzell Innerrhoden and Glarus, the Rebel Zapatista Autonomous Municipalities, communities affiliated with the CIPO-RFM, the Bolivian city councils of FEJUVE, and Kurdish cantons of Rojava.

====== Semi-direct ======
Some modern democracies that are predominantly representative in nature also heavily rely upon forms of political action that are directly democratic. These democracies, which combine elements of representative democracy and direct democracy, are termed semi-direct democracies or participatory democracies. Examples include Switzerland and some U.S. states that frequently conduct referendums and initiatives.

The Swiss confederation is a semi-direct democracy. At the federal level, citizens can propose changes to the constitution (federal popular initiative) or ask for a referendum to be held on any law voted by the parliament. Between January 1995 and June 2005, Swiss citizens voted 31 times, to answer 103 questions (during the same period, French citizens participated in only two referendums). Although in the past 120 years less than 250 initiatives have been put to referendum.

Examples include the extensive use of referendums in the US state of California, which is a state that has more than 20 million voters.

In New England, town meetings are often used, especially in rural areas, to manage local government. This creates a hybrid form of government, with a local direct democracy and a representative state government. For example, most Vermont towns hold annual town meetings in March in which town officers are elected, budgets for the town and schools are voted on, and citizens have the opportunity to speak and be heard on political matters.

====== Lot system ======
The use of a lot system, a characteristic of Athenian democracy, is a feature of some versions of direct democracies. In this system, important governmental and administrative tasks are performed by citizens picked from a lottery.

====== Representative ======
Representative democracy involves the election of government officials by the people being represented. The most common mechanisms involve election of the candidate with a majority or a plurality of the votes. Most western countries have representative systems.

Representatives may be elected or become diplomatic representatives by a particular district (or constituency), or represent the entire electorate through proportional systems, with some using a combination of the two. Some representative democracies also incorporate elements of direct democracy, such as referendums. A characteristic of representative democracy is that while the representatives are elected by the people to act in the people's interest, they retain the freedom to exercise their own judgement as how best to do so. Such reasons have driven criticism upon representative democracy, pointing out the contradictions of representation mechanisms with democracy.

====== Parliamentary ======
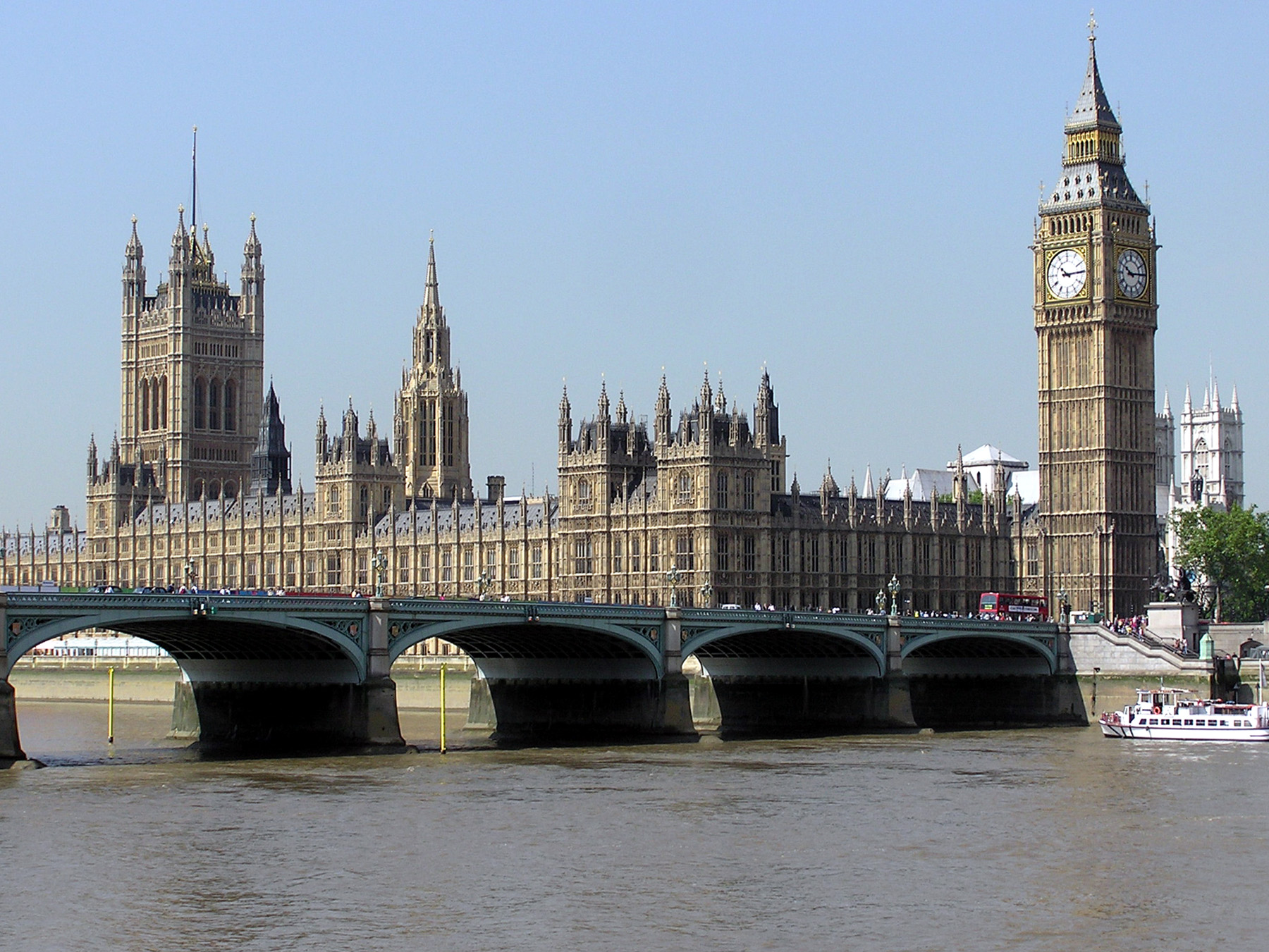
The Palace of Westminster in London, United Kingdom. The Westminster system originates from the British Houses of Parliament.

Parliamentary democracy is a representative democracy where government is appointed by or can be dismissed by, representatives as opposed to a "presidential rule" wherein the president is both head of state and the head of government and is elected by the voters or other body. Under a parliamentary democracy, government is exercised by delegation to an executive ministry and subject to ongoing review, checks and balances by the legislative parliament elected by the people.

In a parliamentary system, the prime minister may be dismissed by the legislature at any point in time for not meeting the expectations of the legislature. This is done through a vote of no confidence where the legislature decides whether or not to remove the prime minister from office with majority support for dismissal. In some countries, the prime minister can also call an election at any point in time, typically when the prime minister believes that they are in good favour with the public as to get re-elected. In other parliamentary democracies, extra elections are virtually never held, a minority government being preferred until the next ordinary elections. An important feature of the parliamentary democracy is the concept of the "loyal opposition". The essence of the concept is that the second-largest political party (or opposition) opposes the governing party (or coalition), while still remaining loyal to the state and its democratic principles.

====== Presidential ======
Presidential democracy is a system where the public elects the president through an election, either a popular vote or the decision of some institution such as the electoral college used in the U.S. The president serves as both the head of state and head of government controlling most of the executive powers. The president serves for a specific term and cannot exceed that amount of time. The legislature often has limited ability to remove a president from office. Elections typically have a fixed date and are not easily changed. The president has direct control over the cabinet, specifically appointing the cabinet members.

The executive usually has the responsibility to execute or implement legislation and may have the limited legislative powers, such as a veto. However, a legislative branch passes legislation and budgets. This provides some measure of separation of powers. In consequence, however, the president and the legislature may end up in the control of separate parties, allowing one to block the other and thereby interfere with the orderly operation of the state. This may be the reason why presidential democracy is not very common outside the Americas, Africa, and Central and Southeast Asia.

A semi-presidential system is a system of democracy in which the government includes both a prime minister and a president. The particular powers held by the prime minister and president vary by country.

==== Typology ====
===== Constitutional monarchy =====
King Charles III, a constitutional monarch

Many countries such as the United Kingdom, Spain, the Netherlands, Belgium, Scandinavian countries, Thailand, Japan and Bhutan turned powerful monarchs into constitutional monarchs (often gradually) with limited or symbolic roles. For example, in the predecessor states to the United Kingdom, constitutional monarchy began to emerge and has continued uninterrupted since the Glorious Revolution of 1688 and passage of the Bill of Rights 1689. Strongly limited constitutional monarchies, such as the United Kingdom, have been referred to as crowned republics by writers such as H. G. Wells.

In other countries, the monarchy was abolished along with the aristocratic system (as in France, China, Russia, Germany, Austria, Hungary, Italy, Greece, and Egypt). An elected person, with or without significant powers, became the head of state in these countries.

Elite upper houses of legislatures, which often had lifetime or hereditary tenure, were common in many states. Over time, these either had their powers limited (as with the British House of Lords) or else became elective and remained powerful (as with the Australian Senate).

===== Republic =====
The term republic has many different meanings, but today often refers to a representative democracy with an elected head of state, such as a president, serving for a limited term, in contrast to states with a hereditary monarch as a head of state, even if these states also are representative democracies with an elected or appointed head of government such as a prime minister.

The Founding Fathers of the United States often criticised direct democracy; James Madison argued, especially in The Federalist No. 10, that what distinguished a direct democracy from a republic was that the former depended on small size and suffered more violently from the effects of faction, whereas a republic could get stronger as it got larger and combats faction by its very structure. Accordingly, during Philadelphia convention Madison called election of representatives by large territories "the only defence against the inconveniencies of democracy consistent with the democratic form of Govt."

Professors Richard Ellis of Willamette University and Michael Nelson of Rhodes College argue that much constitutional thought, from Madison to Lincoln and beyond, has focused on "the problem of majority tyranny". They conclude, "The principles of republican government embedded in the Constitution represent an effort by the framers to ensure that the inalienable rights of life, liberty, and the pursuit of happiness would not be trampled by majorities." What was critical to American values, John Adams insisted, was that the government be "bound by fixed laws, which the people have a voice in making, and a right to defend." As Benjamin Franklin was exiting after writing the US Constitution, Elizabeth Willing Powel asked him "Well, Doctor, what have we got—a republic or a monarchy?". He replied "A republic—if you can keep it."

===== Liberal =====
A liberal democracy is a representative democracy which enshrines a liberal political philosophy, where the ability of the elected representatives to exercise decision-making power is subject to the rule of law, moderated by a constitution or laws such as the protection of the rights and freedoms of individuals, and constrained on the extent to which the will of the majority can be exercised against the rights of minorities.

===== Socialist =====
Socialist thought has several different views on democracy, for example social democracy and democratic socialism. Many democratic socialists and social democrats believe in a form of participatory, industrial, economic and/or workplace democracy combined with a representative democracy.

===== Marxist =====
Marxist theory supports a democratic society centering the working class. Some Marxists and Trotskyists believe in direct democracy or workers' councils (which are sometimes called soviets). This system can begin with workplace democracy and can manifest itself as soviet democracy or dictatorship of the proletariat. Trotskyist groups have interpreted socialist democracy to be synonymous with multi-party far-left representation, autonomous union organizations, worker's control of production, internal party democracy, and the mass participation of the working masses. Some communist parties support a soviet republic with democratic centralism. The Whole-process people's democracy applies consequentialism to democracy, prioritising results delivered to the people over procedure.

===== Anarchist =====
Anarchists are split in this domain, depending on whether they believe that a majority-rule is tyrannic or not. To many anarchists, the only form of democracy considered acceptable is direct democracy. Pierre-Joseph Proudhon argued that the only acceptable form of direct democracy is one in which it is recognised that majority decisions are not binding on the minority, even when unanimous. However, anarcho-communist Murray Bookchin criticised individualist anarchists for opposing democracy and says that majority rule is consistent with anarchism.

Some anarcho-communists oppose the majoritarian nature of direct democracy, feeling that it can impede individual liberty and opt-in favour of a non-majoritarian form of consensus democracy, similar to Proudhon's position on direct democracy.

===== Sortition =====
Sortition is the process of choosing decision-making bodies by random lottery. These bodies can be more representative of the opinions and interests of the people at large than an elected legislature. The technique was widely used in Athenian Democracy and Renaissance Florence and is still used in modern jury selection and citizens' assemblies.

===== Consociational =====
Consociational democracy, also called consociationalism, is a form of democracy based on power-sharing formula between elites representing the social groups within the society. In 1969, Arendt Lijphart argued this would stabilize democracies with factions. A consociational democracy allows for simultaneous majority votes in two or more ethno-religious constituencies, and policies are enacted only if they gain majority support from both or all of them. The Qualified majority voting rule in European Council of Ministers is a consociational democracy approach for supranational democracies. This system, established by the Treaty of Rome, allocates votes to member states in part according to their population, but heavily weighted in favour of the smaller states. A consociational democracy requires consensus of representatives, while consensus democracy requires consensus of electorate.

===== Majoritarian =====
Majoritarian democracy is a form of democracy based upon a principle of majority rule. Majoritarian democracy contrasts with consensus democracy, rule by as many people as possible.

===== Consensus =====
Consensus democracy requires consensus decision-making and supermajority to obtain a larger support than majority. In contrast, in majoritarian democracy minority opinions can potentially be ignored by vote-winning majorities. Constitutions typically require consensus or supermajorities.

===== Ethnic =====
The term ethnic democracy, as used by some political scientists, describes a governance system that combines a structured ethnic dominance with democratic, political and civil rights for all. Both the dominant ethnic group—typically an ethnic majority—and the minority ethnic groups have citizenship and are able to fully participate in the political process. However, critics of the "ethnic democracy" model argue it is a contradiction in terms, and thus conceptually inadequate or confusing; these critics allege that purported ethnic democracies, most notably Israel, are not democratic at all, or are at best a sort of semi-democracy.

===== Inclusive =====
Inclusive democracy is a political theory and political project that aims for direct democracy in all fields of social life: political democracy in the form of face-to-face assemblies which are confederated, economic democracy in a stateless, moneyless and marketless economy, democracy in the social realm, i.e. self-management in places of work and education, and ecological democracy which aims to reintegrate society and nature. The theoretical project of inclusive democracy emerged from the work of political philosopher Takis Fotopoulos in "Towards An Inclusive Democracy" and was further developed in the journal Democracy & Nature and its successor The International Journal of Inclusive Democracy.

===== Participatory =====
A parpolity or participatory polity is a theoretical form of democracy that is ruled by a nested council structure. The guiding philosophy is that people should have decision-making power in proportion to how much they are affected by the decision. Local councils of 25–50 people are completely autonomous on issues that affect only them, and these councils send delegates to higher level councils who are again autonomous regarding issues that affect only the population affected by that council.

A council court of randomly chosen citizens serves as a check on the tyranny of the majority, and rules on which body gets to vote on which issue. Delegates may vote differently from how their sending council might wish but are mandated to communicate the wishes of their sending council. Delegates are recallable at any time. Referendums are possible at any time via votes of lower-level councils, however, not everything is a referendum as this is most likely a waste of time. A parpolity is meant to work in tandem with a participatory economy.

===== Procedural =====
Procedural democracy or proceduralist democracy, proceduralism or hollow democracy is a term used to denote the particular procedures, such as regular elections based on universal suffrage, that produce an electorally-legitimated government. Procedural democracy, with its centering of electoral processes as the basis of democratic legitimacy, is often contrasted with substantive or participatory democracy, which centers the equal participation of all groups in society in the political process as the basis of legitimacy.

===== Radical =====
Radical democracy is based on the idea that there are hierarchical and oppressive power relations that exist in society. Radical democracy's role is to make visible and challenge those relations by allowing for difference, dissent and antagonisms in decision-making processes.

===== Religious =====
Religious democracy is a form of democracy where the values of a particular religion or state religion are preferred. The term applies to all democratic countries in which religion is incorporated into the form of government.

===== Cosmopolitan =====
Cosmopolitan democracy, also known as global democracy or world federalism, is a political system in which democracy is implemented on a global scale, either directly or through representatives. An important justification for this kind of system is that the decisions made in national or regional democracies often affect people outside the constituency who, by definition, cannot vote. By contrast, in a cosmopolitan democracy, the people who are affected by decisions also have a say in them.

Cosmopolitan democracy has been promoted, among others, by physicist Albert Einstein, writer Kurt Vonnegut, columnist George Monbiot, and professors David Held and Daniele Archibugi. The creation of the International Criminal Court in 2003 was seen as a major step forward by many supporters of this type of cosmopolitan democracy.

===== Creative =====
Creative democracy is advocated by American philosopher John Dewey. The main idea about creative democracy is that democracy encourages individual capacity building and the interaction among the society. Dewey argues that democracy is a way of life in his work of "Creative Democracy: The Task Before Us" and an experience built on faith in human nature, faith in human beings, and faith in working with others. Democracy, in Dewey's view, is a moral ideal requiring actual effort and work by people; it is not an institutional concept that exists outside of ourselves. "The task of democracy", Dewey concludes, "is forever that of creation of a freer and more humane experience in which all share and to which all contribute".

===== Guided =====
Guided democracy is a form of democracy that incorporates regular popular elections, but which often carefully "guides" the choices offered to the electorate in a manner that may reduce the ability of the electorate to truly determine the type of government exercised over them. Such democracies typically have only one central authority which is often not subject to meaningful public review by any other governmental authority. Russian-style democracy has often been referred to as a "guided democracy". Russian politicians have referred to their government as having only one center of power or authority, as opposed to most other forms of democracy which usually attempt to incorporate two or more naturally competing sources of authority within the same government.

=== Comparison ===
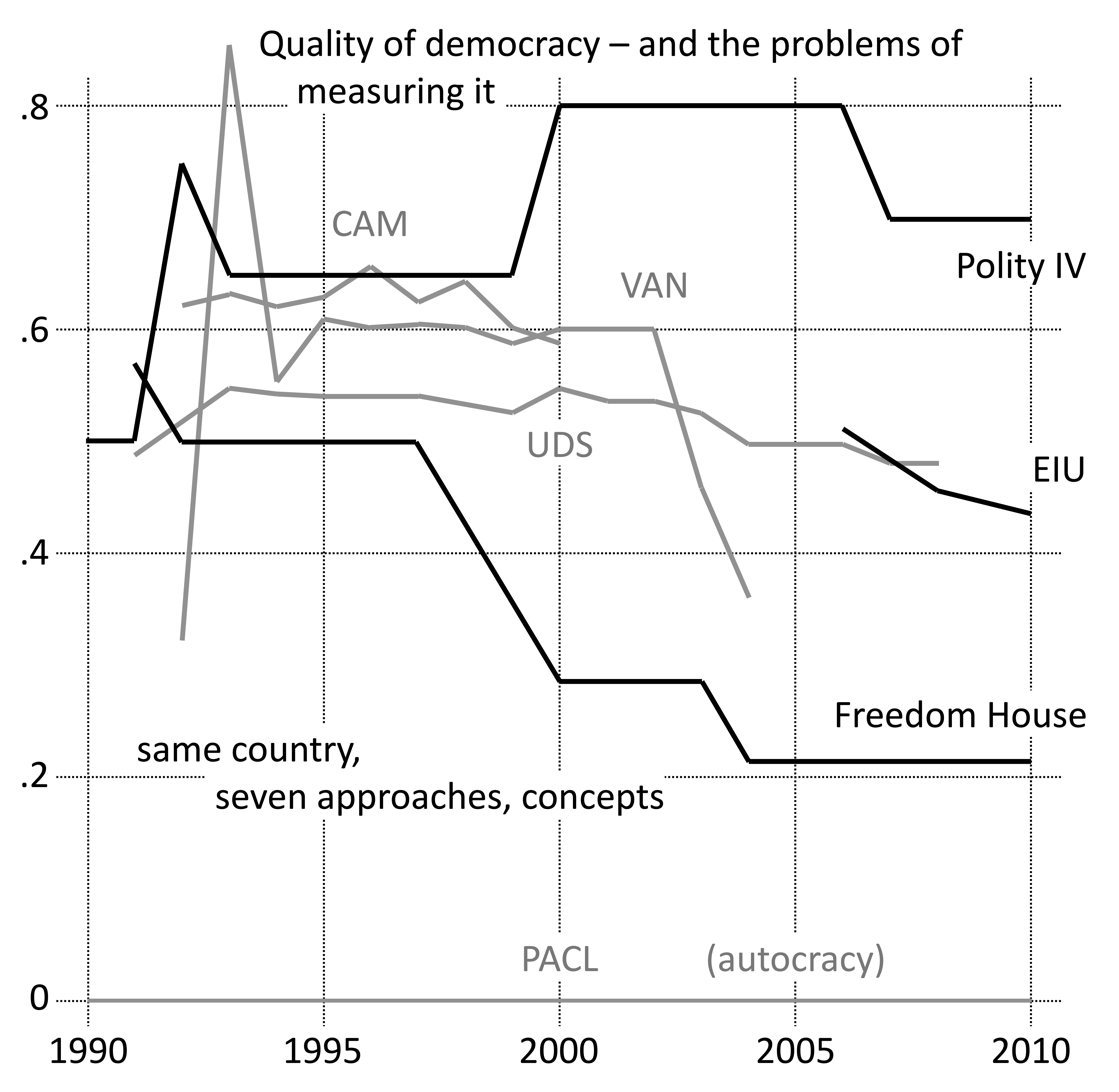
Same country (Russia), seven approaches, concepts (Polity IV, Freedom House, The Economist Democracy Index, CAM, VAN, UDS, PACL)

The search for a common approach to conceptualize, measure and compare democracy remains a challenge in modern political science. This challenge strikes through to measuring, assessing and comparing the quality of democracy, as Seva Gunitsky pointed in 2015 in the Washington Post, based upon his research for Ranking the World – Grading States as a Tool of Global Governance, that measuring democracy can mislead as much as clarify – a problem for academics, policy-makers and anyone who cares about democracy.

In his contribution Lost in the Gray Zone: Competing Measures of Democracy in the Former Soviet Republics to Ranking the World, he, on the example of former Soviet republics, examines fundamental problems with measures of democracy, observing that indices often disagree and occasionally draw contradictory conclusions from observing the same event. He argues, that this reflects inherent tradeoffs in conceptualizing democratic governance, which arise from fundamental normative disagreements about a highly contested concept.

In 2011, Michael Coppedge, John Gerring et al. proposed an approach to such conceptualization and measurement. In their paper Conceptualizing and Measuring Democracy: A New Approach they review some of the weaknesses among contemporary and older approaches, then lay out their approach, characterizing it as historical, multidimensional, disaggregated, and transparent. The authors propose to create a new set of four features to conceptualize and measure democracy. First, historical, extending indicators of democracy back through modern history, wherever possible. Second, a multidimensional approach to the problem of conceptualizing democracy. Third, to collect information relevant to democracy at a highly disaggregated level. Fourth, transparent, a strategy for data collection and presentation that should enhance the precision, validity, transparency, and legitimacy of the resulting indicators. They also sum up the conceptions, and/or aspects, of democracy into six – electoral, liberal, majoritarian, participatory, deliberative, and egalitarian, which taken together offer a fairly comprehensive accounting of the concept of democracy as it is employed today (see overview in the table below).

Conceptions of democracy by Michael Coppedge, John Gerring et al., 2011
| | | Principles | Question | Institutions |
| I. | Electoral | Contestation, competition | Are government offices filled by free and fair multiparty elections? | Elections, political parties, competitiveness and turnover |
| II. | Liberal | Limited government, multiple veto points, horizontal accountability, individual rights, civil liberties, transparency | Is political power decentralized & constrained? | Multiple, independent, and decentralized, with special focus on the role of the media, interest groups, the judiciary, and a written constitution with explicit guarantees |
| III. | Majoritarian | Majority rule, centralization, vertical accountability | Does the majority (or plurality) rule? | Consolidated and centralized, with special focus on the role of political parties |
| IV. | Participatory | Government by the people | Do ordinary citizens participate in politics? | Election law, civil society, local government, direct democracy |
| V. | Deliberative | Government by reason | Are political decisions the product of public deliberation? | Media, hearings, panels, other deliberative bodies |
| VI. | Egalitarian | Political equality | Are all citizens equally empowered? | Designed to ensure equal participation, representation, protection, and politically relevant resources |

=== Measurement of democracy ===
The 2024 The Economist Democracy Index map: Full democracies 9.00–10.00 8.00–8.99 Flawed democracies 7.00–7.99 6.00–6.99 / Hybrid regimes 5.00–5.99 4.00–4.99 / Authoritarian regimes 3.00–3.99 2.00–2.99 1.00–1.99 0.00–0.99

V-Dem Electoral Democracy Index map for 2025: 0.90–1.00 0.80–0.89 0.70–0.79 0.60–0.69 / 0.50–0.59 0.40–0.49 0.30–0.39 0.20–0.29 / 0.10–0.19 0.00–0.09 No data

Measurement of democracy varies according to the different fundamental conceptions of democracy. Minimalist democracy evaluations focus on free and fair elections, while maximalist democracy evaluates additional values, such as human rights, deliberation, economic outcomes or state capacity.

== Non-governmental democracy ==
Aside from the public sphere, similar democratic principles and mechanisms of voting and representation have been used to govern other kinds of groups. Many non-governmental organisations decide policy and leadership by voting. Most trade unions and cooperatives are governed by democratic elections. Corporations are ultimately governed by their shareholders through shareholder democracy. Corporations may also employ systems such as workplace democracy to handle internal governance. Amitai Etzioni has postulated a system that fuses elements of democracy with sharia law, termed Islamic democracy or Islamocracy.

=== Shareholder democracy ===
Shareholder democracy is a concept relating to the governance of corporations by their shareholders. In the United States, shareholders are typically granted voting rights according to the one share, one vote principle. Shareholders may vote annually to elect the company's board of directors, who themselves may choose the company's executives. The shareholder democracy framework may be inaccurate for companies which have different classes of stock that further alter the distribution of voting rights.

== Justification ==
Several justifications for democracy have been postulated.

=== Legitimacy ===
Social contract theory argues that the legitimacy of government is based on consent of the governed, i.e. an election, and that political decisions must reflect the general will. The public legitimacy of democracy varies by country, in some countries religious texts have more public support than the will of the people.

=== Better decision-making ===
Condorcet's jury theorem is logical proof that if each decision-maker has a better than chance probability of making the right decision, then having the largest number of decision-makers, i.e. a democracy, will result in the best decisions. This has also been argued by theories of the wisdom of the crowd. Democracy tends to improve conflict resolution.

=== Economic success ===
In Why Nations Fail, economists Daron Acemoglu and James A. Robinson argue that democracies are more economically successful because undemocratic political systems tend to limit markets and favor monopolies at the expense of the creative destruction which is necessary for sustained economic growth.

A 2019 study by Acemoglu and others estimated that countries switching to democratic from authoritarian rule had on average a 20% higher GDP after 25 years than if they had remained authoritarian. The study examined 122 transitions to democracy and 71 transitions to authoritarian rule, occurring from 1960 to 2010. Acemoglu said this was because democracies tended to invest more in health care and human capital, and reduce special treatment of regime allies.

A 2023 study analyzed the long-term effects of democracy on economic prosperity using new data on GDP per capita and democracy for a dataset between 1789 and 2019. The results indicate that democracy substantially increases economic development.

Unemployment is associated with anti-democratic beliefs.

== Criticism ==
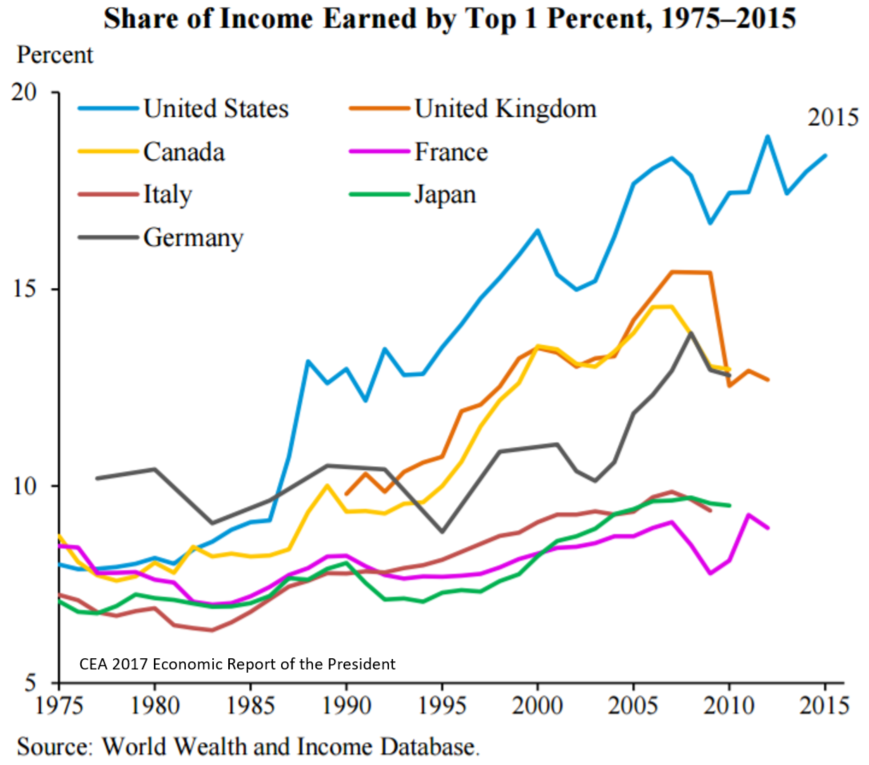
International share of income earned by the top 1% of earners from 1975 to 2015. Critics of democracy often cite institutional failure to address economic inequality.

Democracy as a concept and as a practical implementation has been the subject of critique throughout history. Some critics consider that democratic regimes often fail to be true to the highest principles expected of them, while others criticize the values promoted by constitutional democracy in whole or part.

Opposition to democracy goes as far back as Plato, who argued for a 'government of the best qualified'. More recently, James Madison extensively studied historic attempts at and arguments on democracy in his preparation for the Constitutional Convention, and Winston Churchill remarked that "no one pretends that democracy is perfect or all-wise. Indeed, it has been said that democracy is the worst form of Government except all those other forms that have been tried from time to time".

Critics argue that modern democracies may fail to be sufficiently democratic, and instead function in practice as oligarchies, insofar as governments are more responsive to the preferences of economic elites than to those of ordinary citizens. Others have characterized democracies to some extent as democratic aristocracies. Some critics of democracy have highlighted inconsistencies including low voter turnout, censorship, political polarization, and politicians picking voters through gerrymandering or naturalization.

== Democratic transitions ==
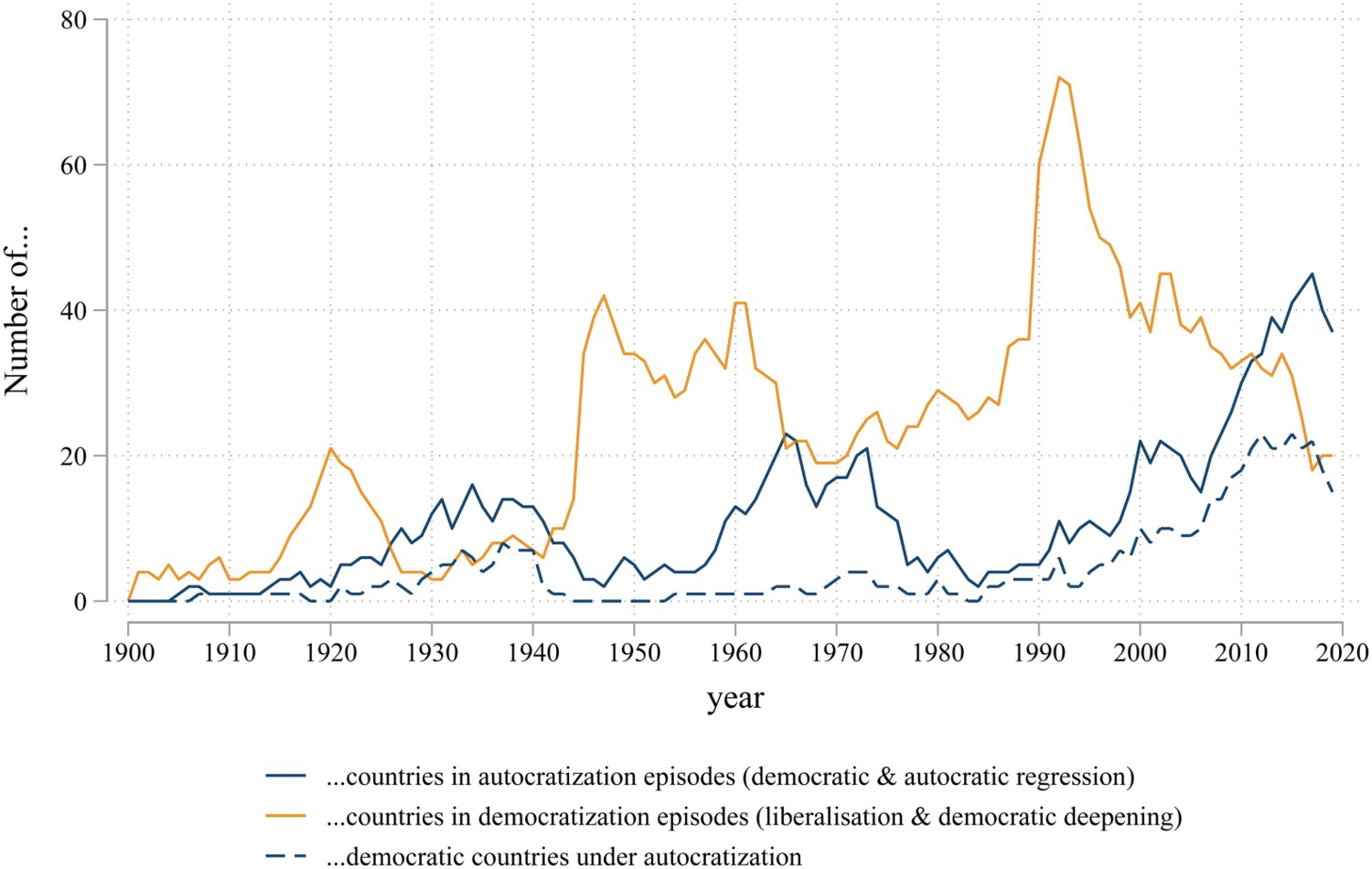
Since c. 2010, the number of countries autocratizing (blue) is higher than those democratizing (yellow).

A democratic transition describes a phase in a country's political system, often created as a result of an incomplete change from an authoritarian regime to a democratic one (or vice versa).

=== Democratization ===
Democratization, or democratisation, is the structural government transition from an authoritarian government to a more democratic political regime, including substantive political changes moving in a democratic direction. The opposite process of democratic transition is known as democratic backsliding or autocratization. Whether and to what extent democratization occurs can be influenced by various factors, including economic development, historical legacies, civil society, and international processes. Some accounts of democratization emphasize how elites drove democratization, whereas other accounts emphasize grassroots bottom-up processes. How democratization occurs has also been used to explain other political phenomena, such as whether a country goes to a war or whether its economy grows.

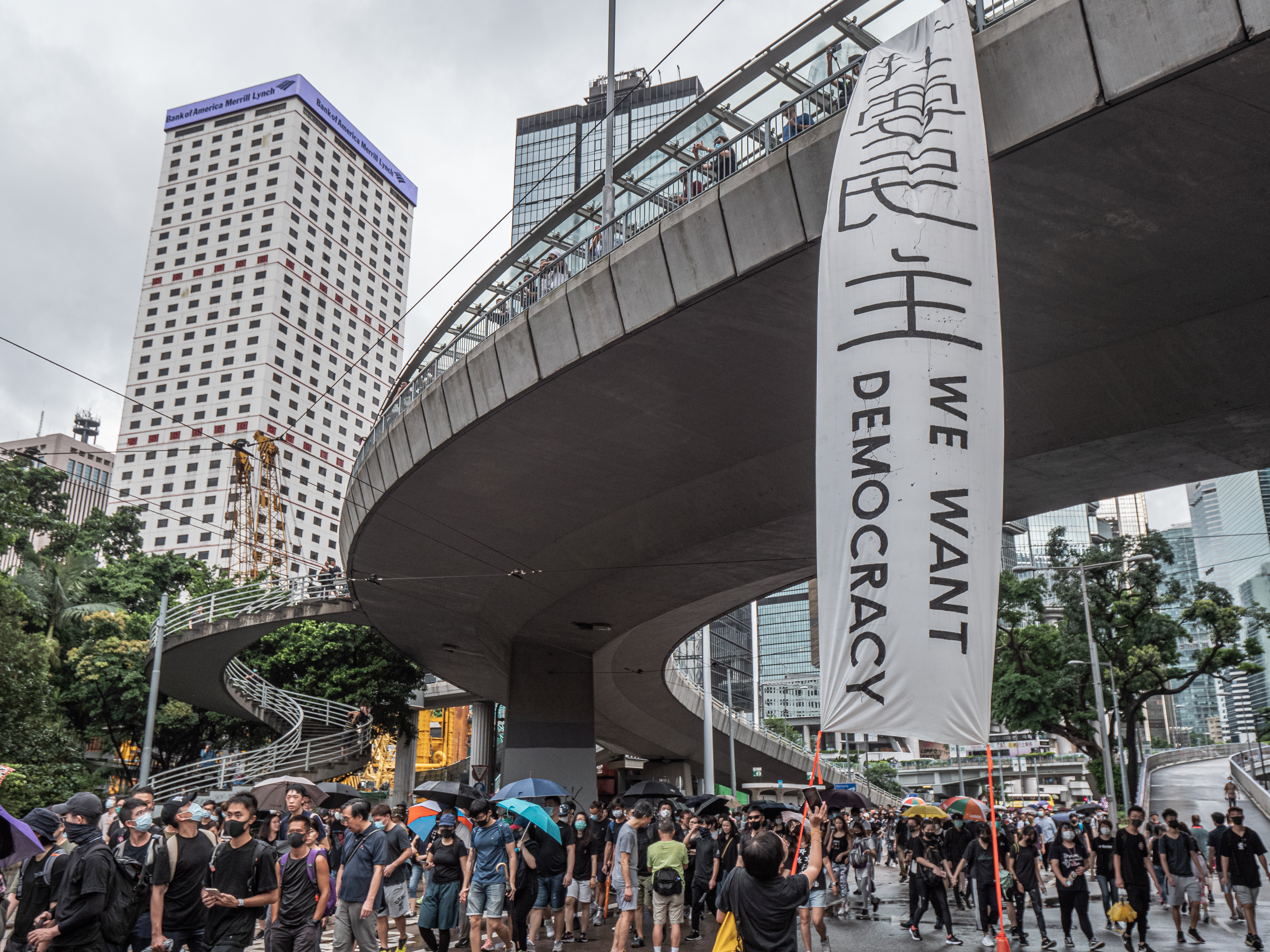
Banner in Hong Kong asking for democracy, August 2019

Several philosophers and researchers have outlined historical and social factors seen as supporting the evolution of democracy. Other commentators have mentioned the influence of economic development. In a related theory, Ronald Inglehart suggests that improved living-standards in modern developed countries can convince people that they can take their basic survival for granted, leading to increased emphasis on self-expression values, which correlates closely with democracy.

Douglas M. Gibler and Andrew Owsiak in their study argued about the importance of peace and stable borders for the development of democracy. It has often been assumed that democracy causes peace, but this study shows that, historically, peace has almost always predated the establishment of democracy.

Carroll Quigley concludes that the characteristics of weapons are the main predictor of democracy: Democracy—this scenario—tends to emerge only when the best weapons available are easy for individuals to obtain and use. By the 1800s, guns were the best personal weapons available, and in the United States of America (already nominally democratic), almost everyone could afford to buy a gun, and could learn how to use it fairly easily. Governments could not do any better: it became the age of mass armies of citizen soldiers with guns. Similarly, Periclean Greece was an age of the citizen soldier and democracy.

Other theories stressed the relevance of education and of human capital—and within them of cognitive ability to increasing tolerance, rationality, political literacy and participation. Two effects of education and cognitive ability are distinguished:

- a cognitive effect (competence to make rational choices, better information-processing)
- an ethical effect (support of democratic values, freedom, human rights etc.), which itself depends on intelligence.

Evidence consistent with conventional theories of why democracy emerges and is sustained has been hard to come by. Statistical analyses have challenged modernisation theory by demonstrating that there is no reliable evidence for the claim that democracy is more likely to emerge when countries become wealthier, more educated, or less unequal. In fact, empirical evidence shows that economic growth and education may not lead to increased demand for democratization as modernization theory suggests: historically, most countries attained high levels of access to primary education well before transitioning to democracy. Rather than acting as a catalyst for democratization, in some situations education provision may instead be used by non-democratic regimes to indoctrinate their subjects and strengthen their power.

The assumed link between education and economic growth is called into question when analyzing empirical evidence. Across different countries, the correlation between education attainment and math test scores is very weak (.07). A similarly weak relationship exists between per-pupil expenditures and math competency (.26). Additionally, historical evidence suggests that average human capital (measured using literacy rates) of the masses does not explain the onset of industrialization in France from 1750 to 1850 despite arguments to the contrary. Together, these findings show that education does not always promote human capital and economic growth as is generally argued to be the case. Instead, the evidence implies that education provision often falls short of its expressed goals, or, alternatively, that political actors use education to promote goals other than economic growth and development.

Some scholars have searched for the "deep" determinants of contemporary political institutions, be they geographical or demographic.

An example of this is the disease environment. Places with different mortality rates had different populations and productivity levels around the world. For example, in Africa, the tsetse fly—which afflicts humans and livestock—reduced the ability of Africans to plough the land. This made Africa less settled. As a consequence, political power was less concentrated. This also affected the colonial institutions European countries established in Africa. Whether colonial settlers could live or not in a place made them develop different institutions which led to different economic and social paths. This also affected the distribution of power and the collective actions people could take. As a result, some African countries ended up having democracies and others autocracies.

An example of geographical determinants for democracy is having access to coastal areas and rivers. This natural endowment has a positive relation with economic development thanks to the benefits of trade. Trade brought economic development, which in turn, broadened power. Rulers wanting to increase revenues had to protect property-rights to create incentives for people to invest. As more people had more power, more concessions had to be made by the ruler and in many places this process lead to democracy. These determinants defined the structure of the society moving the balance of political power.

Robert Michels asserts that although democracy can never be fully realised, democracy may be developed automatically in the act of striving for democracy:

The peasant in the fable, when on his deathbed, tells his sons that a treasure is buried in the field. After the old man's death the sons dig everywhere in order to discover the treasure. They do not find it. But their indefatigable labor improves the soil and secures for them a comparative well-being. The treasure in the fable may well symbolise democracy.

Democracy in modern times has almost always faced opposition from the previously existing government, and many times it has faced opposition from social elites. The implementation of a democratic government from a non-democratic state is typically brought by peaceful or violent democratic revolution.

The V-Dem Institute found 2026 ongoing democratization in 18 countries: Benin, Bolivia, Botswana, Bazil, Dominican Republic, Fiji, Guatemala, Lesotho, Mauritius, Montenegro, Poland, Seychelles, Solomon Islands, Sri Lanka, Timor-Leste, Thailand, The Gambia, and Zambia.

==== Democracy promotion ====
Promotion of democracy can increase the quality of already existing democracies, reduce political apathy, and the chance of democratic backsliding. Democracy promotion measures include voting advice applications, participatory democracy, increasing electoral integrity, youth suffrage and civic education, reducing barriers to entry for new political parties, increasing proportionality, reducing presidentialism and aligning with median voter preferences.

=== Autocratization ===
The V-Dem Institute's indices of democracy indicate that worldwide democracy peaked in 2012, and has since declined, with the decline accelerating in the early 2020s.

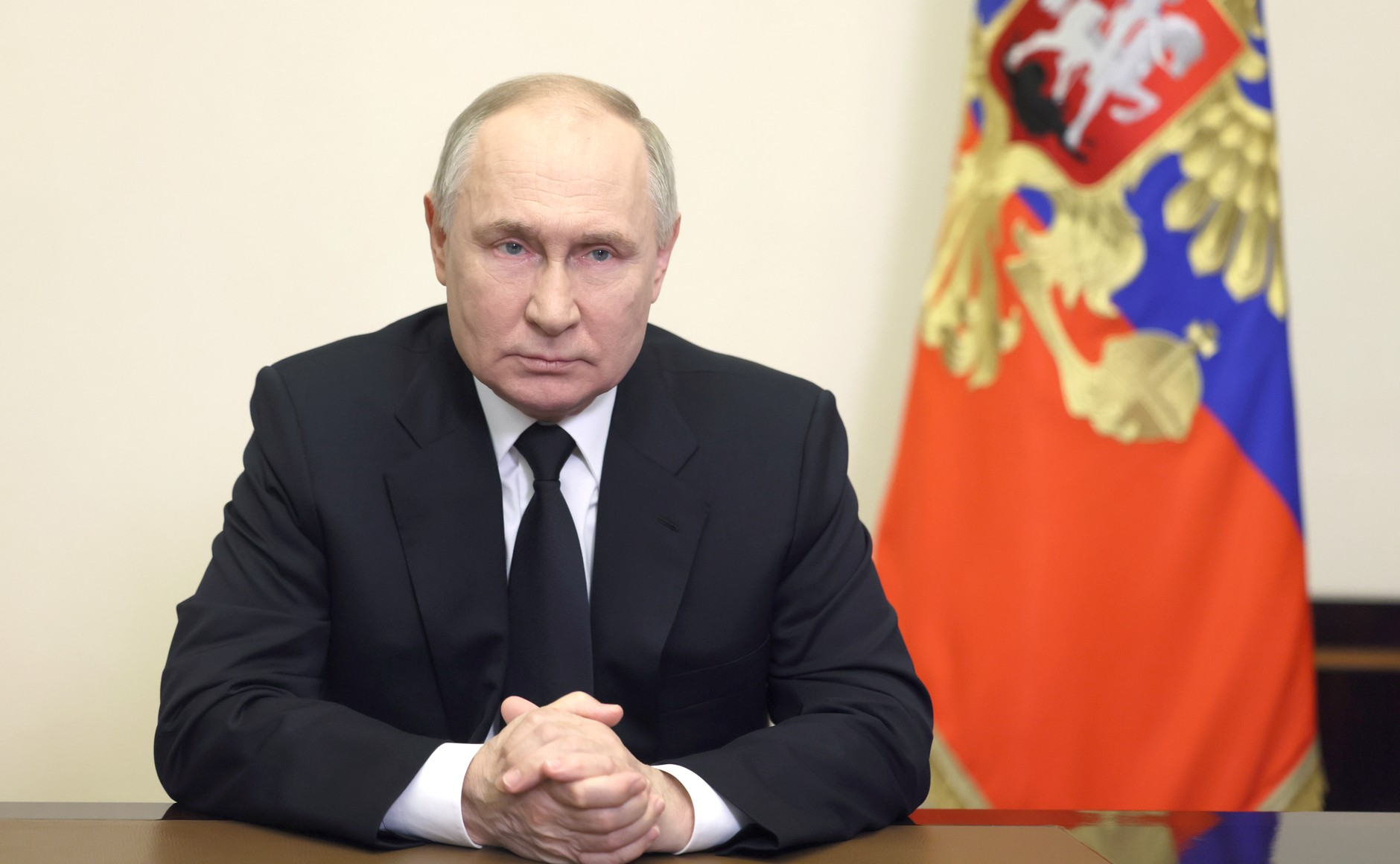
Russia under Vladimir Putin has turned into an authoritarian state

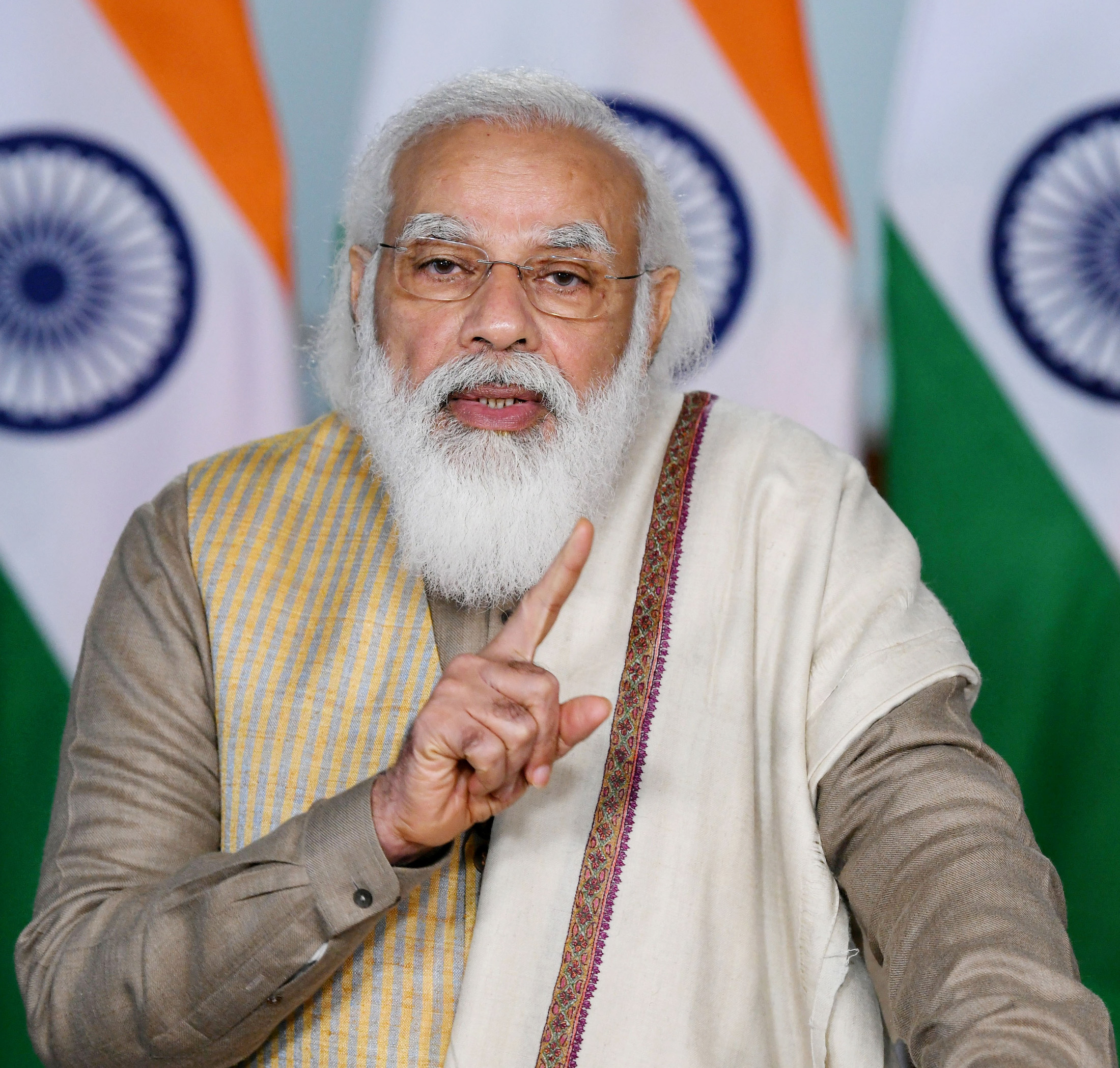
Prime Minister Narendra Modi, during whose tenure India, often called the "world's largest democracy," has faced significant democratic backsliding according to international indexes.

Democratic backsliding (Note: Other names include democratic decline, de-democratization, democratic erosion, democratic decay, democratic recession, democratic regression, and democratic deconsolidation.) is a form of autocratization, a process of structural government transition from democracy toward authoritarianism in which the exercise of political power becomes broader, less based on democracy, and more arbitrary and repressive. The process typically restricts the space for public contest and political participation in the process of government selection. Democratic backsliding involves the weakening of democratic institutions, such as when the transition of power becomes less peaceful or elections less free and fair, or when the powers that be violate individual rights that underpin democracies, especially freedom of expression.

Steven Levitsky says: "It's not up to voters to defend a democracy. That's asking far, far too much of voters, to cast their ballot on the basis of some set of abstract principles or procedures. With the exception of a handful of cases, voters never, ever — in any society, in any culture — prioritize democracy over all else. Individual voters worry about much more mundane things, as is their right. It is up to élites and institutions to protect democracy — not voters."

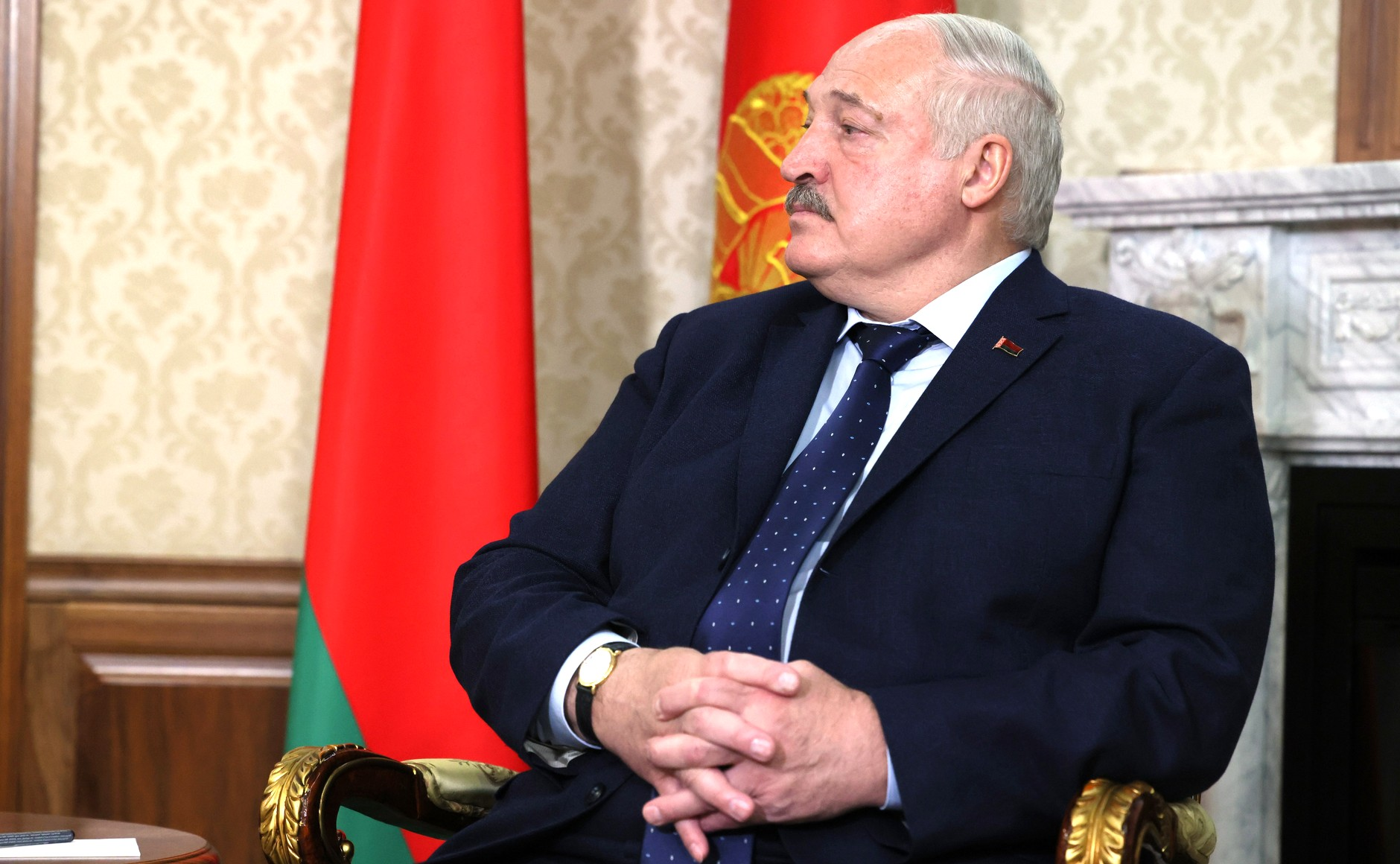
Alexander Lukashenko is currently serving his seventh and final term as the President of Belarus, leading many to claim he is "Europe's Last Dictator".

The V-Dem Institute found 2026 ongoing democratic backsliding in 44 countries: Afghanistan, Argentina, Armenia, Belarus, Burkina Faso, Cambodia, Central African Republic, Croatia, Georgia, Greece, Guinea, Guinea-Bissau, El Salvador, Haiti, Hong Kong, Hungary, India, Indonesia, Italy, Ivory Coast, Kuwait, Kyrgyzstan, Libya, Mali, Madagascar, Mauretania, Mexico, Moldova, Mozambique, Myanmar, Nicaragua, Niger, Pakistan, Peru, Philippines, Slovakia, Slovenia, Senegal, Serbia, Romania, Togo, Ukraine, the United Kingdom, and the United States.

Global population-weighted democracy measures show faster autocratization in the last decades than country-based averages. Autocratic countries tend to have a higher population growth.

==== Disruption ====
Some democratic governments have experienced sudden state collapse and regime change to an undemocratic form of government. Domestic military coups or rebellions are the most common means by which democratic governments have been overthrown. (See List of coups and coup attempts by country and List of civil wars.) Examples include the Spanish Civil War, the Coup of 18 Brumaire that ended the French First Republic, and the 28 May 1926 coup d'état which ended the First Portuguese Republic. Some military coups are supported by foreign governments, such as the 1954 Guatemalan coup d'état and the 1953 Iranian coup d'état. Other types of a sudden end to democracy include:

- Invasion, for example the German occupation of Czechoslovakia, and the fall of South Vietnam.
- Self-coup, in which the leader of the government extra-legally seizes all power or unlawfully extends the term in office. This can be done through:
  - Amending or suspending the constitution, such as with the 1992 Peruvian coup d'état
  - An "electoral self-coup" using election fraud to obtain re-election of a previously fairly elected official or political party. For example, in the 1999 Ukrainian presidential election, 2003 Russian legislative election, and 2004 Russian presidential election.
- Royal coup, in which a monarch not normally involved in government seizes all power. For example, the 6 January Dictatorship, begun in 1929 when King Alexander I of Yugoslavia dismissed parliament and started ruling by decree.

Democratic backsliding can end democracy in a gradual manner, by increasing emphasis on national security and eroding free and fair elections, freedom of expression, independence of the judiciary, rule of law. A famous example is the Enabling Act of 1933, which lawfully ended democracy in Weimar Germany and marked the transition to Nazi Germany.

== Influence of the media ==
The theory of democracy relies on the implicit assumption that voters are well informed about social issues, policies, and candidates so that they can make a truly informed decision. Since the late 20th century there has been a growing concern that voters may be poorly informed due to the news media's focusing more on entertainment and gossip and less on serious journalistic research on political issues.

The media professors Michael Gurevitch and Jay Blumler have proposed a number of functions that the mass media are expected to fulfill in a democracy:

- Surveillance of the sociopolitical environment
- Meaningful agenda setting
- Platforms for an intelligible and illuminating advocacy
- Dialogue across a diverse range of views
- Mechanisms for holding officials to account for how they have exercised power
- Incentives for citizens to learn, choose, and become involved
- A principled resistance to the efforts of forces outside the media to subvert their independence, integrity, and ability to serve the audience
- A sense of respect for the audience member, as potentially concerned and able to make sense of his or her political environment

This proposal has inspired a lot of discussions over whether the news media are actually fulfilling the requirements that a well functioning democracy requires. Commercial mass media are generally not accountable to anybody but their owners, and they have no obligation to serve a democratic function. They are controlled mainly by economic market forces. Fierce economic competition may force the mass media to divert themselves from any democratic ideals and focus entirely on how to survive the competition.

The tabloidization and popularization of the news media is seen in an increasing focus on human examples rather than statistics and principles. There is more focus on politicians as personalities and less focus on political issues in the popular media. Election campaigns are covered more as horse races and less as debates about ideologies and issues. The dominating media focus on spin, conflict, and competitive strategies has made voters perceive the politicians as egoists rather than idealists. This fosters mistrust and a cynical attitude to politics, less civic engagement, and less interest in voting. The ability to find effective political solutions to social problems is hampered when problems tend to be blamed on individuals rather than on structural causes. This person-centered focus may have far-reaching consequences not only for domestic problems but also for foreign policy when international conflicts are blamed on foreign heads of state rather than on political and economic structures. A strong media focus on fear and terrorism has allowed military logic to penetrate public institutions, leading to increased surveillance and the erosion of civil rights.

The responsiveness and accountability of the democratic system is compromised when lack of access to substantive, diverse, and undistorted information is handicapping the citizens' capability of evaluating the political process. The fast pace and trivialization in the competitive news media is dumbing down the political debate. Thorough and balanced investigation of complex political issues does not fit into this format. The political communication is characterized by short time horizons, short slogans, simple explanations, and simple solutions. This is conducive to political populism rather than serious deliberation.

Commercial mass media are often differentiated along the political spectrum so that people can hear mainly opinions that they already agree with. Too much controversy and diverse opinions are not always profitable for the commercial news media. Political polarization is emerging when different people read different news and watch different TV channels. This polarization has been worsened by the emergence of the social media that allow people to communicate mainly with groups of like-minded people, the so-called echo chambers. Extreme political polarization may undermine the trust in democratic institutions, leading to erosion of civil rights and free speech and in some cases even reversion to autocracy.

Many media scholars have discussed non-commercial news media with public service obligations as a means to improve the democratic process by providing the kind of political contents that a free market does not provide. The World Bank has recommended public service broadcasting in order to strengthen democracy in developing countries. These broadcasting services should be accountable to an independent regulatory body that is adequately protected from interference from political and economic interests. Public service media have an obligation to provide reliable information to voters. Many countries have publicly funded radio and television stations with public service obligations, especially in Europe and Japan, while such media are weak or non-existent in other countries including the US. Several studies have shown that the stronger the dominance of commercial broadcast media over public service media, the less the amount of policy-relevant information in the media and the more focus on horse race journalism, personalities, and the pecadillos of politicians. Public service broadcasters are characterized by more policy-relevant information and more respect for journalistic norms and impartiality than the commercial media. However, the trend of deregulation has put the public service model under increased pressure from competition with commercial media.

The emergence of the internet and the social media has profoundly altered the conditions for political communication. The social media have given ordinary citizens easy access to voice their opinion and share information while bypassing the filters of the large news media. This is often seen as an advantage for democracy. The new possibilities for communication have fundamentally changed the way social movements and protest movements operate and organize. The internet and social media have provided powerful new tools for democracy movements in developing countries and emerging democracies, enabling them to bypass censorship, voice their opinions, and organize protests.

A serious problem with the social media is that they have no truth filters. The established news media have to guard their reputation as trustworthy, while ordinary citizens may post unreliable information. In fact, studies show that false stories are going more viral than true stories. The proliferation of false stories and conspiracy theories may undermine public trust in the political system and public officials.

Reliable information sources are essential for the democratic process. Less democratic governments rely heavily on censorship, propaganda, and misinformation in order to stay in power, while independent sources of information are able to undermine their legitimacy.

== See also ==
- Defensive democracy
- Democracy Ranking
- Democracy-Dictatorship Index
- Democratic peace theory
- Delegate model of representation
- Empowered democracy
- Energy democracy
- Industrial democracy
- Meritocracy
- Parliament in the Making
- Political representation of nature
- Power to the people
- Trustee model of representation
