= Bazil =

List of given names

Bazil is a given name. Notable people with the name include:

- Bazil Ashmawy, Irish radio and television personality who appears on Raidió Teilifís Éireann
- Bazil Assan (1860–1918), Romanian engineer and explorer
- Bazil Broketail, 1992 fantasy novel by author Christopher Rowley
- Bazil Donovan of Blue Rodeo, Canadian pop and country rock band, formed in 1984 in Toronto, Ontario
- Bazil Gordon (1768–1847), American businessman, migrant from Scotland
- Bazil McCourtey, fictional character from the British Channel 4 soap opera Hollyoaks, played by Shebah Ronay

== See also ==
- Basil
- Basile (disambiguation)
- Baskil
- Bazile (disambiguation)
