= Majoritarian democracy =

Form of government

Majoritarian democracy is a form of democracy based upon a principle of majority rule. Majoritarian democracy contrasts with consensus democracy, rule by as many people as possible.

== Characteristics ==
Arend Lijphart offers what is perhaps the dominant definition of majoritarian democracy. He identifies that majoritarian democracy is based on the Westminster model, and majority rule. According to Lijphart, the key features of a majoritarian democracy are:

- Concentration of executive power. This means that the Cabinet or executive is composed entirely of members from a single party who holds the majority of seats in the legislature.
- Cabinet dominance over the legislature
- Asymmetric bicameralism. This means that while there are two houses of parliament, one house has significantly more power than the other house.
- Two party system
- One-dimensional party system, where the two dominant parties largely fall on a spectrum along a single dimension e.g. representing the left and right from a socio-economic perspective.
- Plurality-based electoral system
- Unitary and centralised government
- Unwritten constitution and parliamentary sovereignty
- Representative (not direct) democracy.

In the majoritarian vision of democracy, voters mandate elected politicians to enact the policies they proposed during their electoral campaign. Elections are the focal point of political engagement, with limited ability for the people to influence policymaking between elections.

== Criticisms ==
Though common, majoritarian democracy is not universally accepted – majoritarian democracy is criticized as having the inherent danger of becoming a "tyranny of the majority" whereby the majority in society could oppress or exclude minority groups, which can lead to violence and civil war. Some argue that since parliament, statutes and preparatory works are very important in majoritarian democracies, and considering the absence of a tradition to exercise judicial review at the national level, majoritarian democracies are undemocratic.

Fascism rejects majoritarian democracy because the latter assumes equality of citizens and fascists claim that fascism is a form of authoritarian democracy that represents the views of a dynamic organized minority of a nation rather than the disorganized majority.

== Examples ==
There are few, if any, purely majoritarian democracies. In many democracies, majoritarianism is modified or limited by one or several mechanisms which attempt to represent minorities.

The United Kingdom is the classical example of a majoritarian system. The United Kingdom's Westminster system has been borrowed and adapted in many other democracies. Majoritarian features of the United Kingdom's political system include:

- A single party typically forms a majority in Parliament, and thus forms executive government
- The executive typically dominates the legislature
- Two party system
- First-past-the-post electoral system.

However, even in the United Kingdom, majoritarianism has been at least somewhat limited by the introduction of devolved parliaments. As well even the principle of majority rule is not always ascribed to. It can happen that a party with less than majority of the votes will achieve a majority of seats in parliament. As well, first past the post is only certain to produce a majoritarian result if only two parties are in the contest, seldom the case in any district in a modern developed society. The use of multiple districts and first past the post in each district means a majority of seats can be won with less than a majority of votes overall. The 2024 U.K. election produced just such a result.

Australia is a generally majoritarian democracy, although some have argued that it typifies a form of 'modified majoritarianism'. This is because while the lower house of the Australian Parliament is elected via preferential voting, the upper house is elected via proportional representation. Proportional representation is a voting system that allows for greater minority representation. Canada is subject to a similar debate.

The United States has some elements of majoritarianism - such as first-past-the-post voting in many contexts - however this is complicated by variation among states. In addition, a strict separation of powers and strong federalism mediates majoritarianism. An example of this complexity can be seen in the role of the Electoral College in presidential elections, as a result of which a candidate who loses the popular vote may still go on to win the presidency.

== See also ==
- Majoritarianism
- Majority rule
- Consensus democracy
