= Bazile =

Bazile may refer to one of the following:

== People ==
- Castera Bazile (1923–1966), Haitian painter
- Hervé Bazile (born 1990), Haitian footballer
- Leon M. Bazile (1890–1967), American judge
- Léon Bazile Perrault (1832–1908), French painter
- Nate Bazile is a character on the American TV show Life Unexpected

== Places ==
- Les Autels-Saint-Bazile, French commune
- Saint-Bazile, French commune
- Saint-Bazile-de-la-Roche, French commune
- Saint-Bazile-de-Meyssac, French commune
- Bazile Township, Antelope County, Nebraska, USA
- Bazile Mills, Nebraska, USA
