= Third wave of autocratization =

21st-century surge away from democracy

- Part of waves of democracy c. 2000s – present
Third wave of democratization
- V-Dem report on countries autocratizing (red) or democratizing (blue) substantially and significantly (2010–2020). Countries in grey are substantially unchanged.
- Location: Worldwide
- Key events: War on terror, 2001; Great Recession, 2008; COVID-19 pandemic, 2019

The third wave of autocratization is a scholarly proposition that countries worldwide have trended away from liberal democracy toward authoritarianism in the 21st century. The war on terror, the Great Recession, and the COVID-19 pandemic were some of the most significant events in exacerbating autocratization. Since the 2010s, more countries have been autocratizing than democratizing.

Unlike previous waves of autocratization, the third wave has resulted in significant autocratization in healthy liberal democracies. Modern autocrats have relied less on military coups to consolidate power and more on being legitimately elected to positions of power and eroding separation of powers from within, often weaponizing law to persecute political opponents.

Waves of autocracy contrast with waves of democracy. The third wave of autocratization follows the third wave of democratization, which began in 1974. Experts disagree on exactly when the third wave of autocratization began (and when the corresponding third wave of democratization ended), but most, such as political scientists Anna Lührmann and Staffan I. Lindberg of the V-Dem Institute, agree that the transition began in the 1990s or during the war on terror in the 2000s.

Autocratization has ignited international pro-democracy movements such as the Arab Spring and the Gen Z protests. It has also led to developments in protest tactics against police riot control methods and popularization of new pro-democracy symbols like the three-finger salute and Straw Hats' Jolly Roger.

== Timeline ==
Modern democratic backsliding, rather than occurring through military coups (the norm during the Cold War era), has more frequently occurred through the election of personalist leaders or parties who subsequently dismantle democratic institutions. New democracies that were weakly established during the third wave of democratization have been especially vulnerable to democratic backsliding.

=== 1990s ===
Some scholars argue the third wave of autocratization began as early as the 1990s.

=== War on terror (post-2001) ===
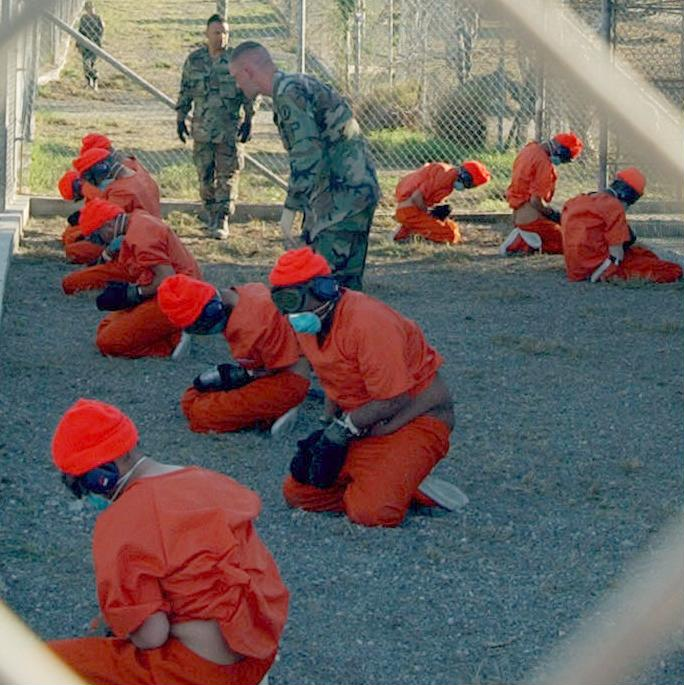
Detainees in orange jumpsuits bound in a holding area at Guantanamo Bay, 2002

Following the September 11 attacks and subsequent war on terror, democratic backsliding ensued. The war on terror is a global military campaign initiated by the United States in response to the September 11 attacks in 2001. It is a global conflict spanning multiple wars that some researchers and political scientists have argued replaced the Cold War.

In 2003, political scientists and theorists believed the third wave had crested and would soon ebb, just as the first and second waves did.

While support for the "war on terror" was high among the American public during its initial years, it had become deeply unpopular by the late 2000s. Controversy over the war has focused on its morality, casualties, and continuity, with critics questioning government measures that infringed civil liberties and human rights. Controversial practices of coalition forces have been condemned, including drone warfare, surveillance, torture, extraordinary rendition, and various war crimes. Participating governments have been criticized for implementing authoritarian measures, repressing minorities, fomenting Islamophobia globally, and damaging public health and the environment. Security analysts say the conflict has no military solution, since terrorism is not an identifiable enemy, and emphasize the importance of negotiations and political solutions to resolve the roots of the crises.

=== Post-Great Recession (2010s) ===
Number of countries experiencing autocratization and democratization episodes, 1900–2019.

Some scholars argue the third wave of autocratization accelerated in the 2010s (in the aftermath of the Great Recession), particularly at the end of the decade, when the number of liberal democracies was at an all-time high. From 2010 to 2020, the V-Dem Institute reported a global decline in liberal democracy.

A 2020 study by V-Dem and University of Gothenburg scholars, State of the world 2019: autocratization surges – resistance grows, argued "the third wave of autocratization, that was already accelerating in 2019, risks gaining unprecedented momentum." Other scholars argued in 2019 that while the third wave is unfolding, "panic is not warranted: the current declines are relatively mild and the global share of democratic countries remains close to its all-time high."

=== COVID-19 (2019–2022) ===
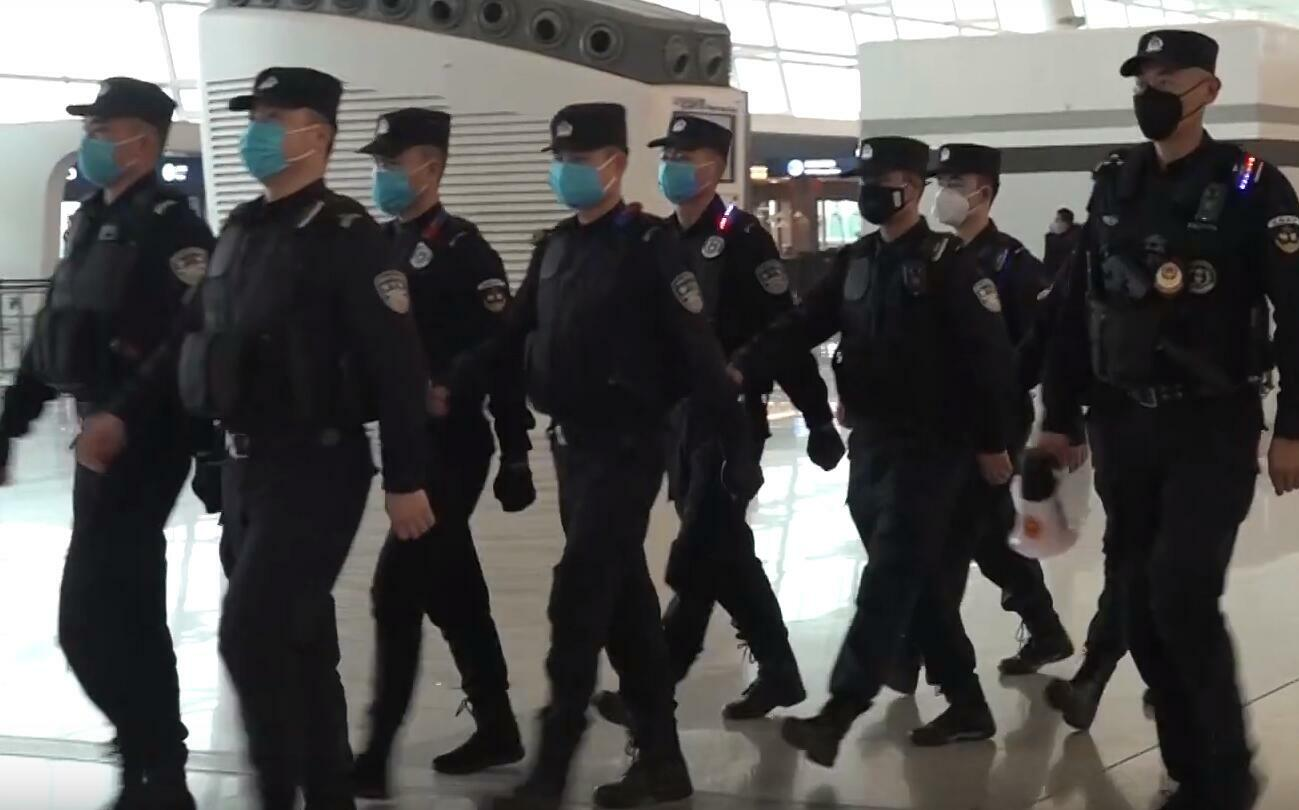
Police wearing masks in the Wuhan Tianhe International Airport during the initial COVID-19 outbreak, January 2020

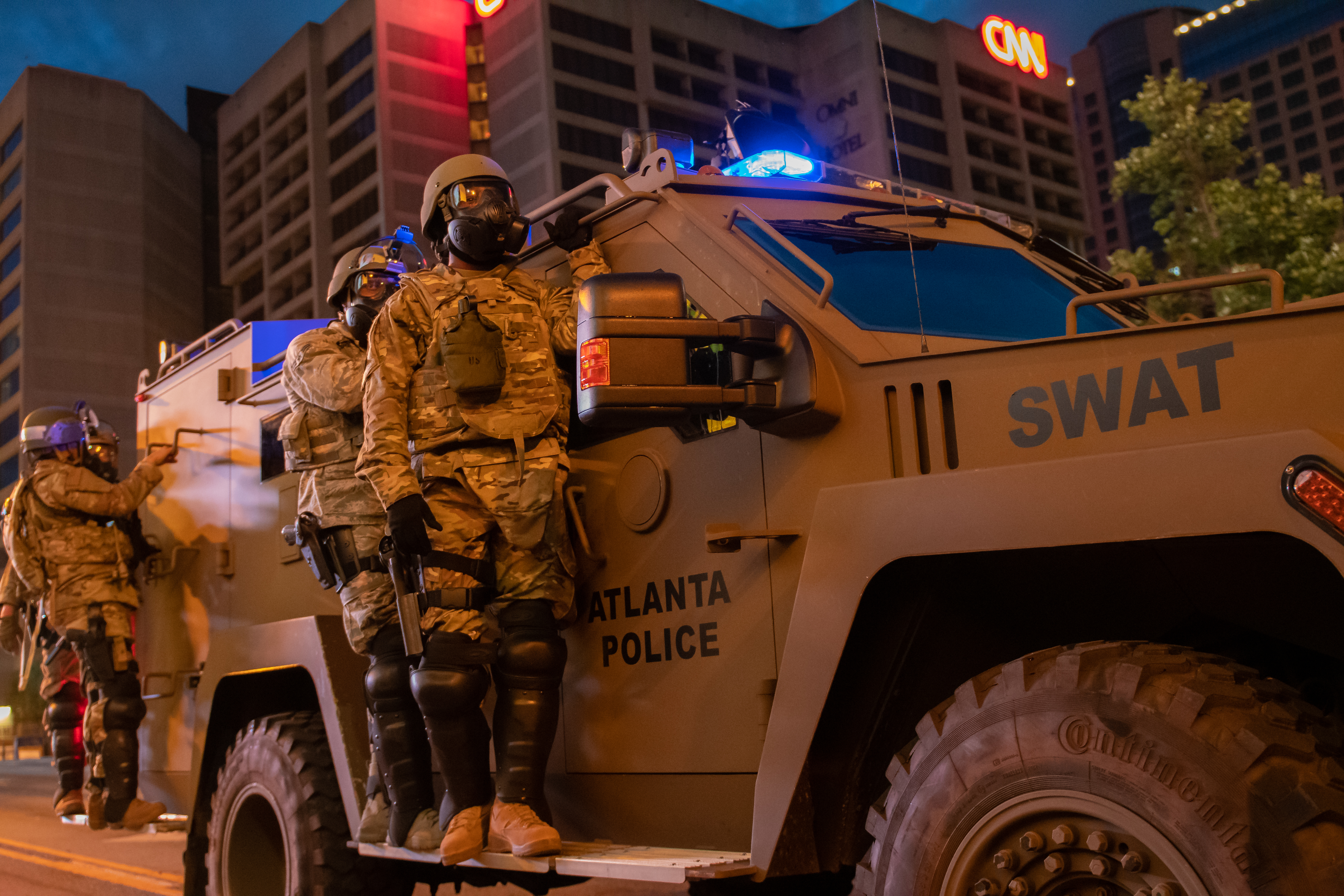
U.S. National Guard soldiers assist SWAT team members enforcing a lockdown curfew during the George Floyd protests in Atlanta, June 2020

The COVID-19 pandemic was used as a pretext for autocratization, largely due to the heavy practical and logistical disruption the virus and subsequent lockdown restrictions have caused. Across the world, national governments found themselves with no other choice but to suspend, cancel, or postpone numerous democratic elections at both national and subnational governmental levels.

The 2020 Freedom House report also highlighted a variety of responses relating to government mishandling of the pandemic against the best interests of its citizens, such as denial of the existence of COVID-19 in Turkmenistan and Nicaragua, and the promotion of unsafe or unproven treatments in Brazil and Tanzania. The Freedom in the World score dropped by 45 points in 2020, marking the most significant decline in the prior fifteen years. According to Ingo Keilitz, both authoritarian leaders and surveillance capitalists used the pandemic to "make massive shifts and reprogramming of our sensibilities about privacy and civil liberties that may not be reversible." Keilitz saw this as a threat to judicial independence. The Pandemic Backsliding Index created by V-Dem measured authoritarian and illiberal practices between March and December 2020 for 144 countries, and found 80% of all countries engaged in authoritarian practices such as emergency measures without time limit, disproportionate limitations on the role of legislatures, and government disinformation campaigns. Dr. Abouzzohour at Harvard University said that from 2020 to 2022, COVID-19 "undoubtedly contributed to the deterioration of political freedom" globally. She claimed "heightened repression, militarization, and restrictions" following from the pandemic contributed.

This is due to factors that have been weakened such as "checks against abuses of power, protection of vulnerable groups, transparency and anti-corruption, free media and expression, and credible elections." As governments were entrusted with unprecedented powers to protect public health, even the strongest democracies "failed to guard themselves against abuse of power," said an op-ed on Newsweek. This is because emergency powers grant governments the ability to '"make regulations without an act of parliament" These powers are typically intended to take "rapid action" and combat instability. Emergency powers have been used by some governments to extend state power. This arguably occurred in Moscow, where tens of thousands of cameras with facial-recognition features were supposedly installed to track contagion, however, these systems risk remaining in place after the pandemic. According to a 2020 Brookings Institution report, "the challenges posed by the need for mass surveillance suggest that the resilience of democratic regimes cannot be taken for granted." The same study highlighted foreign disinformation surrounding COVID-19 as a threat to democracy, stating that the pandemic presented an opportunity for malign actors to "multiply the production of fake news, conspiracy theories, and manipulated information", it further stated that "Russia and China exploited the chaos induced by COVID-19 to promote their geopolitical interests and continue to destabilise western democracies."

An article on the journal Democratic Theory comments that a side effect of COVID-19 will be a "long-term effect on established democracies around the world." Part of this long-term effect includes the increasing prevalence of democratic backsliding; while proportional responses to a global pandemic are necessary, excessive measures under abusive enforcement have raised concerns that democracy, in nations where it is already unstable, is declining worldwide.

After the National Assembly of Hungary passed legislation allowing Viktor Orbán to rule by decree, the Washington Post declared the pandemic had "killed its first democracy." During the Hong Kong protests in 2020, police used newly-passed pandemic laws banning groups of more than four to disperse protesters.

=== Post-COVID (2022–present) ===
V-Dem Liberal Democracy Index 2026

In the 2020s, democratic backsliding has increasingly been observed not only in newer or weakly institutionalized democracies, but also in long-established democratic systems.

According to the V-Dem Institute's Democracy Report 2026, nearly a quarter of the world's countries were undergoing autocratization in 2025, including several in Europe and North America. The report also highlights growing concerns about declines in democratic quality and increasing pressures on media and journalists worldwide.

Russia under Vladimir Putin has repeatedly engaged in foreign electoral interference and disinformation campaigns aimed at damaging opponents of far-right populist factions, including in three US elections to support Donald Trump (2016, 2020, 2024) and in German elections to support the AfD, or Alternative for Germany (2025). Scholars have said this contributed to the third wave of autocratization.

== See also ==
- Anti-fascism
- Broligarchy
- Censorship
- Democratic backsliding
  - Democratic backsliding in Europe by country
- Far-right
- Fascism
- Guy Fawkes mask
- White identity politics
- Inverted totalitarianism
- Long-range acoustic device
- Neo-fascism
- Neo-nationalism
- Political impact of the COVID-19 pandemic
- Police response to Gaza war protests at universities
- Surveillance capitalism
- Totalitarianism
- Unmanned aerial vehicles in law enforcement
- V-Dem Democracy Indices
- Waves of democracy
