= Waves of democracy =

Major surges of democracy in history

In political science, the waves of democracy or waves of democratization are major surges of democracy that have occurred in history, in contrast with waves of autocracy or waves of autocratization, where democratic backsliding occurs. The third wave of autocratization is ongoing and began during the war on terror or Great Recession.

Although the term appears at least as early as 1887, it was popularized by Samuel P. Huntington, a political scientist at Harvard University, in his article published in the Journal of Democracy and further expounded in his 1991 book, The Third Wave: Democratization in the Late Twentieth Century. Democratization waves have been linked to sudden shifts in the distribution of power among the great powers, which created openings and incentives to introduce sweeping domestic reforms.

Scholars debate the precise number of democratic waves. Huntington describes three waves: the first "slow" wave of the 19th century, a second wave after World War II, and a third wave beginning in the mid-1970s in southern Europe, followed by Latin America and Asia. Though his book does not discuss the collapse of the Soviet bloc, a number of scholars have taken the "Third Wave" to include the democratic transitions of 1989–1991.

Seva Gunitsky of the University of Toronto has referred to 13 waves, from the Atlantic Revolutions of the 18th century to the Arab Spring of the 21st. Scholars have also noted that the appearance of "waves" of democracy largely vanishes when women's suffrage is taken into account. Some countries change their positions quite dramatically: Switzerland, which is typically included as part of the first wave, did not grant women the right to vote until 1971.

== Definition ==
In his 1991 book, The Third Wave, Huntington defined a democratic wave as "a group of transitions from nondemocratic to democratic regimes that occur within a specified period of time and that significantly outnumber transitions in the opposite directions during that period of time." (Huntington 1991, 15) Mainwaring and Aníbal Pérez-Liñán (2014, 70) offer a similar definition: "any historical period during which there is a sustained and significant increase in the proportion of competitive regimes (democracies and semi-democracies)." Gunitsky (2018) defines a democratic wave as a clustering of attempted or successful democratic transitions, coupled with linkages among the transitions in that cluster.

== Huntington's three waves ==
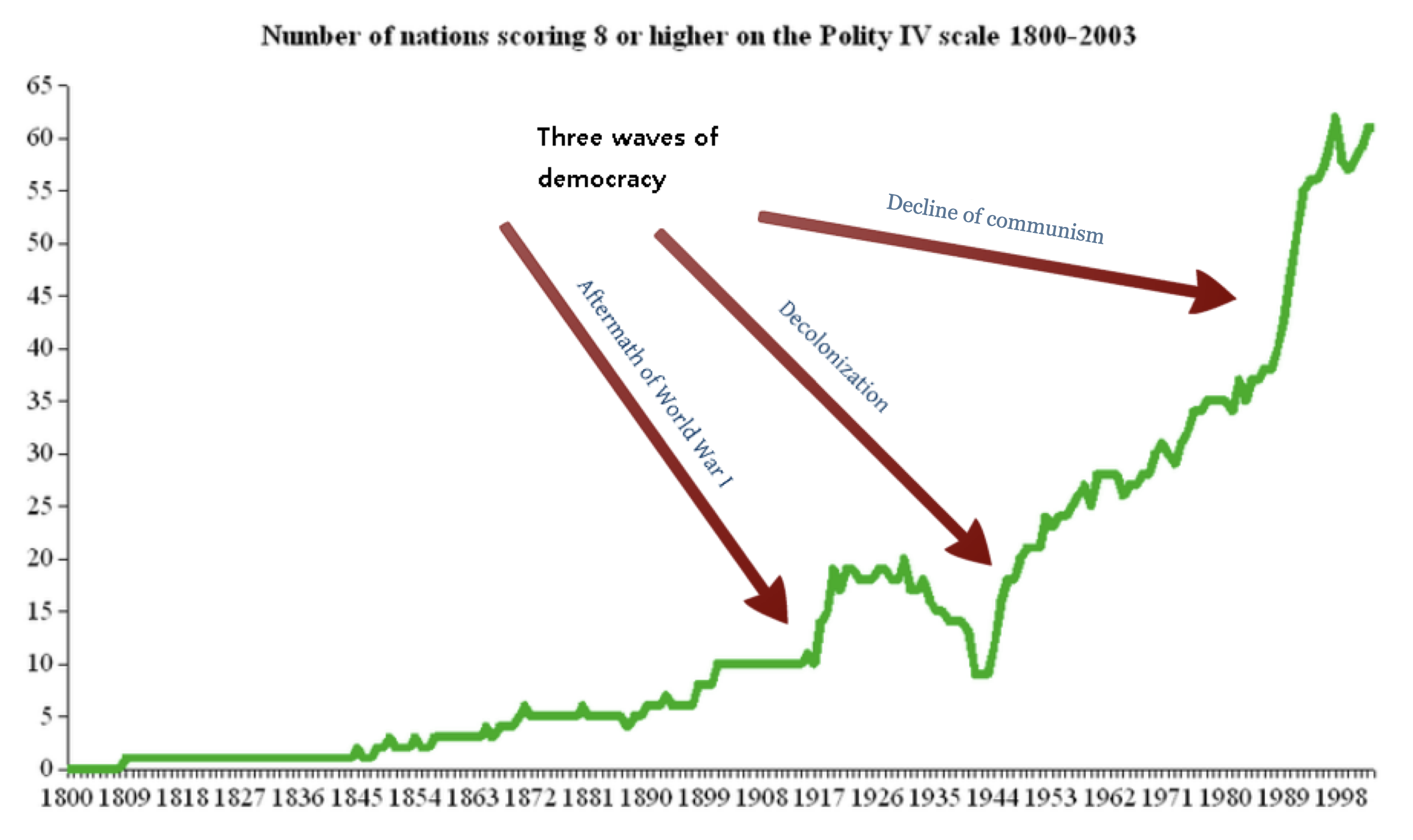
The three waves of democracy

Number of countries democratizing vs autocratizing by year

=== First ===
The first wave of democracy (1828–1926) began in the early 19th century when suffrage was granted to the majority of white males in the United States ("Jacksonian democracy"). This was followed by France, Britain, Canada, Australia, Italy, and Argentina, and a few others, before 1900. At its peak, after the breakup of the Russian, German, Austrian, and Ottoman empires in 1918, the first wave saw 29 democracies in the world. Reversal began in 1922, when Benito Mussolini rose to power in Italy. The collapse primarily hit newly formed democracies, which could not stand against the aggressive rise of communist, fascist, and militaristic authoritarian or totalitarian movements that systematically rejected democracy. The nadir of the first wave came in 1942, when the number of democracies in the world dropped to a mere twelve.

=== Second ===
The second wave began following the Allied victory in World War II, and crested nearly 20 years later, in 1962, with 36 recognised democracies in the world. The second wave ebbed as well at this point, and the total number dropped to 30 democracies between 1962 and the mid-1970s.

=== Third ===
==== Democratization ====
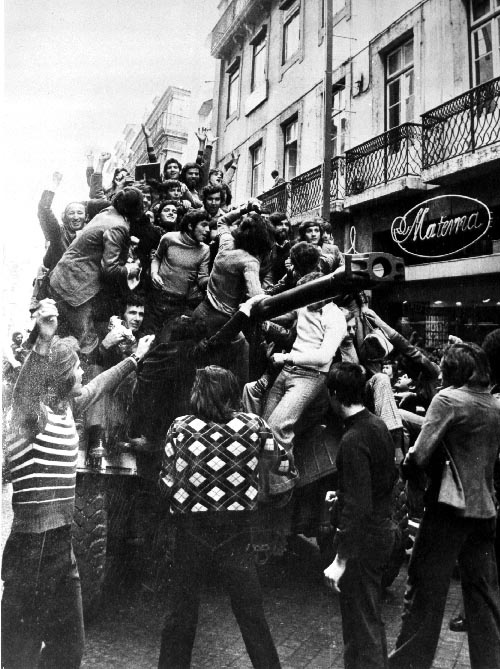
Portuguese people during the Carnation Revolution, which ignited the third wave of democratization, 1974

In his 1991 book The Third Wave, political scientist Samuel P. Huntington proposed a third wave of democratization was occurring, describing the global trend in 1991 where more than 60 countries throughout Europe, Latin America, Asia, and Africa had undergone some form of democratic transitions since 1974. The catch-phrase "the third wave" has been widely used among scholars studying what is considered by some to be democratic transitions and democratization throughout much of the developing world.

Proponents of the third wave of democracy argue it began with the 1974 Carnation Revolution in Portugal, the fall of the Greek Junta, and the late-1970s Spanish transition to democracy. This was followed by the historic democratic transitions in Latin America in the 1980s, Asia-Pacific countries (Philippines, South Korea, and Taiwan) from 1986 to 1988, Eastern Europe after the collapse of the Soviet Union, and sub-Saharan Africa, beginning in 1989. The expansion of democracy in some regions was stunning. In Latin America, only Colombia, Costa Rica, and Venezuela were democratic by 1978, and only Cuba and Haiti remained authoritarian by 1995, when the wave had swept across twenty countries. Huntington points out that three-fourths of the new democracies were Roman Catholic; most Protestant countries already were democratic. He emphasizes the Vatican Council of 1962, which turned the Church from defenders of the old established order into an opponent of totalitarianism.

==== Autocratization ====
V-Dem Liberal Democracy Index 2026

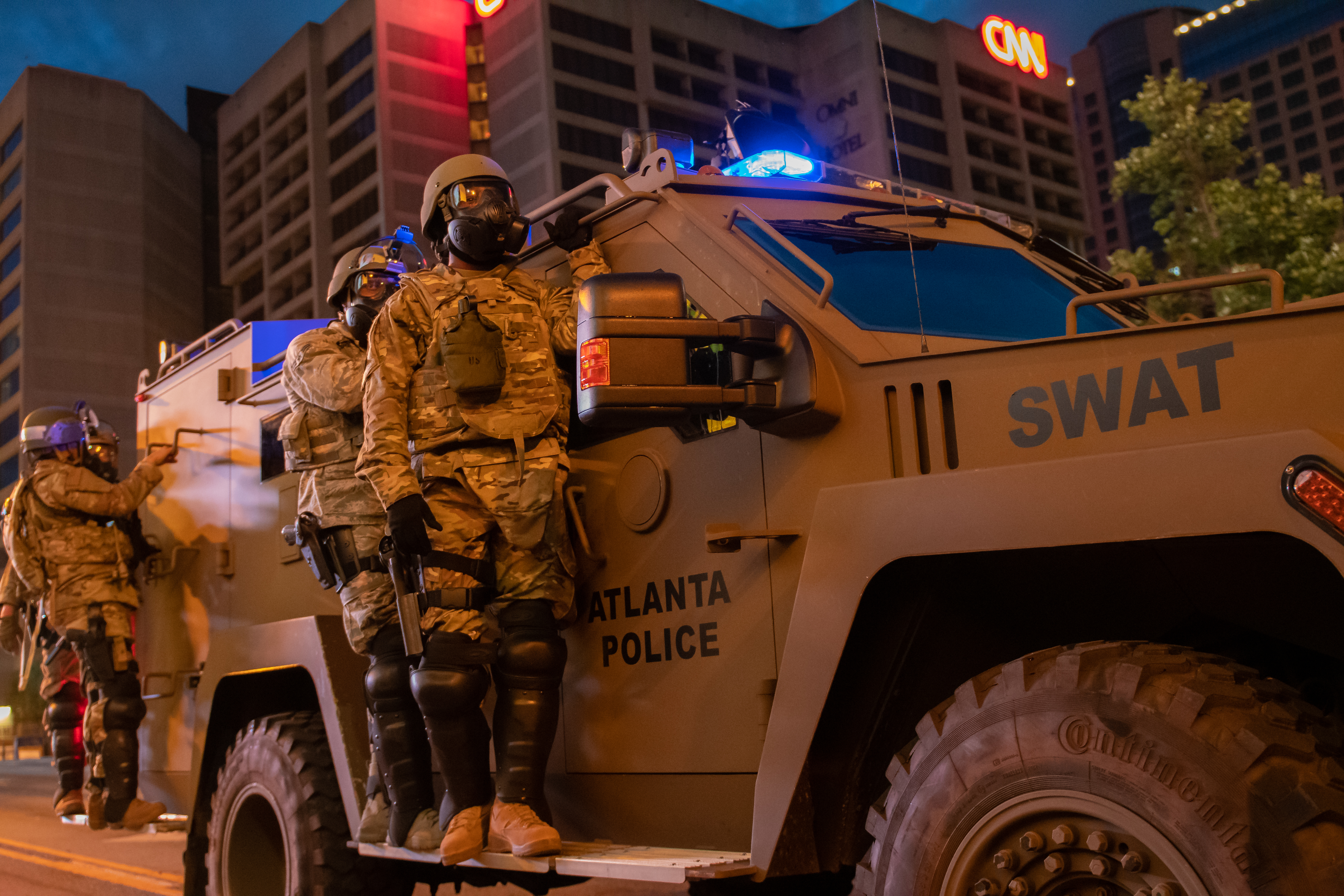
U.S. National Guard soldiers assist SWAT team members enforcing a curfew during the George Floyd protests in Atlanta, 2020

The third wave of autocratization is a scholarly proposition that countries worldwide have trended away from liberal democracy toward authoritarianism in the 21st century. The war on terror, the Great Recession, and the COVID-19 pandemic were some of the most significant events in exacerbating autocratization. Since the 2010s, more countries have been autocratizing than democratizing.

Unlike previous waves of autocratization, the third wave has resulted in significant autocratization in healthy liberal democracies. Modern autocrats have relied less on military coups to consolidate power and more on being legitimately elected to positions of power and eroding separation of powers from within, often weaponizing law to persecute political opponents.

Waves of autocracy contrast with waves of democracy. The third wave of autocratization follows the third wave of democratization, which began in 1974. Experts disagree on exactly when the third wave of autocratization began (and when the corresponding third wave of democratization ended), but most, such as political scientists Anna Lührmann and Staffan I. Lindberg of the V-Dem Institute, agree that the transition began in the 1990s or during the war on terror in the 2000s.

Autocratization has ignited international pro-democracy movements such as the Arab Spring and the Gen Z protests. It has also led to developments in protest tactics against police riot control methods and popularization of new pro-democracy symbols like the three-finger salute and Straw Hats' Jolly Roger.

== Arab Spring ==
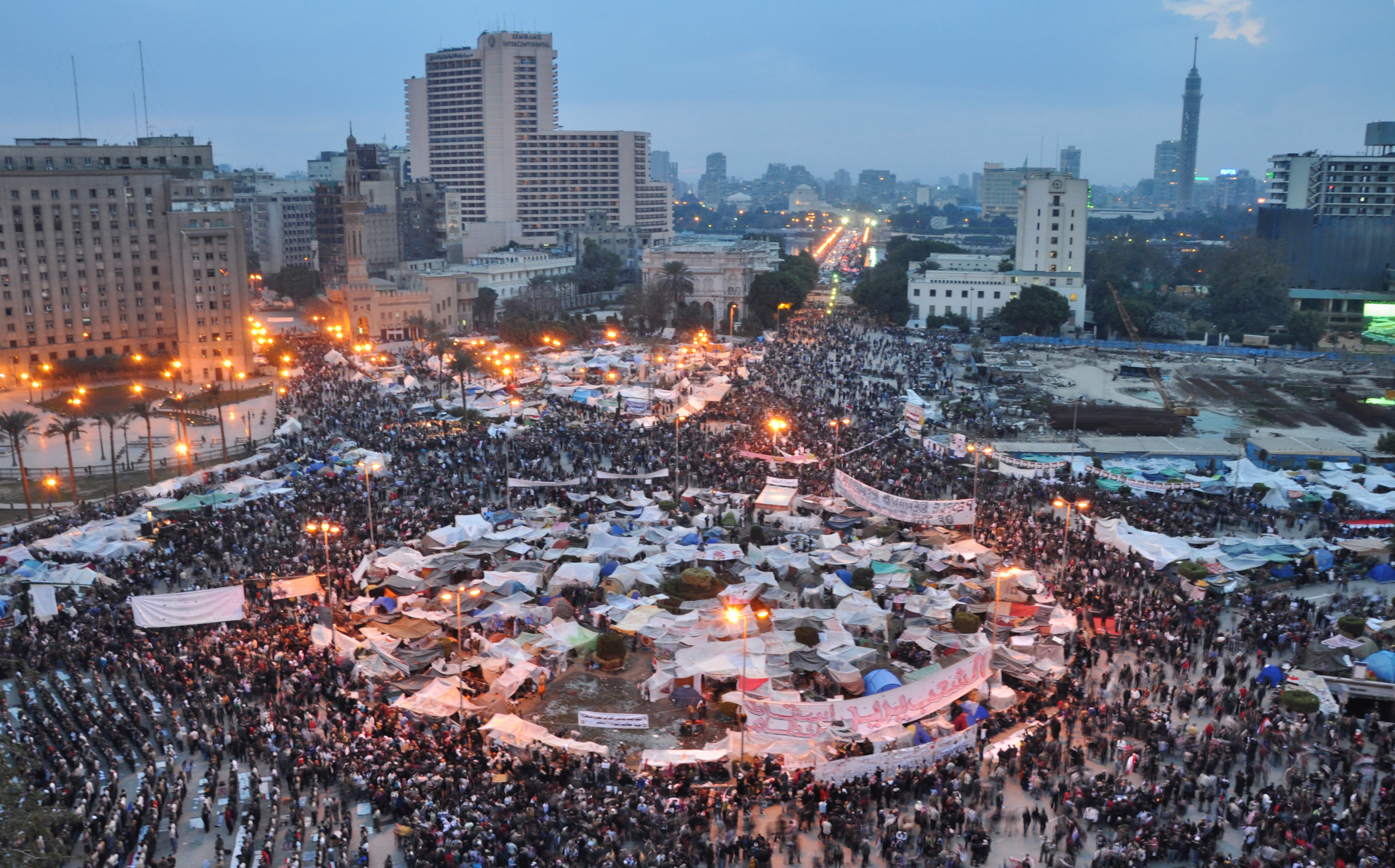
Demonstrations in Tahrir Square, Cairo (2011)

Experts have associated the collapse of several dictatorships in the Middle East and North Africa, a phenomenon known as the Arab Spring, with the events that followed the fall of the Soviet Union in Eastern Europe. The similarity between the two phenomena inspired hope for a fourth wave of democratization. A few months after the apparent beginning of the transition, most of the Arab political openings closed, causing an inevitable pullback. In particular in Egypt, the democratically elected government pushed for an authoritarian Islamist agenda, and in opposition to the rule of law, quickly issued a constitutional declaration that gave them sweeping powers over the state's judicial system until the new constitution was passed. This resulted in mass protests, and eventually the overthrow of Morsi by the Egyptian military. The main causes of the regression and crisis in all the affected countries are attributed to corruption, unemployment, social injustice, and autocratic political systems.

Despite the apparently unsolvable situation, the UN, under the administration of Ban Ki-moon, tried to work as a mediator between the governments and the protesters. Political scholar Larry Diamond has claimed that the role of the United States in the democratic transition of the Arab world was fundamental. Digital media played a large role in creating favorable conditions for uprisings, helped to publicize key igniting events, and then facilitated those uprisings and their diffusion. But digital media did not do this alone or as suddenly as some observers have claimed. The story of the Arab Spring, according to Howard and Hussain, began over a decade ago as internet access and mobile phones began to diffuse rapidly through North Africa and the Middle East. The citizens that could afford internet access, the wealthy and powerful, mostly, played a huge role in the Egypt, Tunisia, and Bahrain uprisings. Over time, online criticism of governments became more public and common, setting the stage for the Arab Spring. Digital media also allowed women and minorities to enter political discussions, and ultimately, the ensuing protests and revolutions as well.

Whether or not the Arab Spring counts as a distinct democratic wave is challenged by scholars on empirical grounds, as Tunisia is the only Arab Spring nation that successfully consolidated into a semi-stable democratic state following its uprising (according to the democracy-evaluating organization Freedom House, as of 2020). Since the accession of Kais Saied to the office of president, Tunisia has seen a decline in the democratic freedoms enjoyed by its citizens.

== 2010s–present ==
From the beginning of the 2010s and after the Great Recession, worldwide pro-democracy and anti-democratic backsliding protests have focused on racial equality, human rights, freedom, the fight against police brutality, and social justice.

- Anti-austerity movement in Greece
- Colour revolution
- Occupy movement
- 2010 Spanish general strike
- 2010 Kyrgyz Revolution
- Arab spring
- 2011 Macedonian protests
- 2011 United States public employee protests
- 2011 Chinese pro-democracy protests
  - Wukan protests
- Gezi Park protests
- Euromaidan
- Protests against Nicolás Maduro
- 2014 Hong Kong protests
- 2014 Vietnam anti-China protests
- 2015 Macedonian protests
- 2016 Macedonian protests
- Protests against Donald Trump
- Protests against Daniel Ortega
- 2018 Vietnam protests
- 2018 Haitian protests
- 2018–2024 Arab protests
- Sardines movement
- Protests against Elon Musk
- 2019–2020 Hong Kong protests
- 2019–2022 Chilean protests
- 2019–2020 Iranian protests
- 2019–2020 Maltese protests
- 2021–2022 Iranian protests
- End SARS
- 2020 Polish LGBT protests
- 2020 Argentine protests
- 2020–2021 Belarusian protests
- 2020–2021 Thai protests
- George Floyd protests
- 2020 Kyrgyz Revolution
- 2021 Greek protests
- 2021 Cuban protests
- 2021–2022 Afghan protests
- 2021–2023 Myanmar protests
- Protests against the Russo-Ukrainian war (2022–present)
- Protests against responses to the COVID-19 pandemic
- 2022 Kazakh protests
- 2022 Sri Lankan protests
- Mahsa Amini protests
- 2022 COVID-19 protests in China
- 2023 Polish protests
- 2023–2024 Georgian protests
- March 2024 Cuban protests
- 2024 Bangladesh uprising
- 2024–present Serbian anti-corruption protests
- 2024–2025 Georgian protests
- Protests against the second Trump administration
  - No Kings protests
  - Response to the Department of Government Efficiency
- 2025 Slovak protests
- 2025 Turkish protests
- 2025 Indonesian protests
- 2025 Nepalese Gen Z protests
- 2025–2026 Philippine anti-corruption protests
- 2025 Moroccan Gen Z protests
- 2025 Cameroonian protests
- 2025–2026 Iranian protests
- 2026 Ugandan protests
- Flamingo Revolution
- Gen Z protests

== Gunitsky's 13 waves ==
In a 2018 study in Perspectives on Politics, Seva Gunitsky of the University of Toronto identifies 13 waves of democracy. His main criterion is rejection of autocracy. By contrast, Huntington used the much narrower criterion of voting rights for the majority of men.

1. Atlantic Wave (1776–1798)
2. Latin American wars of independence (1809–1824)
3. First Constitutional Wave (1820–1821)
4. Romantic-Nationalist Wave (1830–1831)
5. Spring of Nations (1848–1849)
6. Second Constitutional Wave (1905–1912)
7. Post-WWI Wave (1919–1922)
8. Post-WWII Wave (1945–1950)
9. African Decolonization Wave (1956–1968)
10. Modernization Wave, also known as the Third Wave (1974–1988)
11. Post-Soviet Wave (1989–1992)
12. Colour revolutions (2000–2007)
13. Arab Spring (2011–2012)

== See also ==
- Democratic backsliding
- Democratic transition
- History of democracy
