= Democratic backsliding in the Americas by country =

This article discusses democratic backsliding by country in the Americas. Democratic backsliding is the process of a country losing democratic qualities over time.

== North America ==
=== Mexico ===
Shannon K. O'Neil, the vice president, deputy director of Studies, and Nelson and David Rockefeller senior fellow for Latin America Studies at the Council on Foreign Relations, argued that Mexico was undergoing democratic backsliding under President Andrés Manuel López Obrador, who displayed little regard for democratic processes, lashed out against critical journalists and columnists, and harassed non-governmental organizations and civil society movements investigating corruption, supporting women's rights or defending human rights.

In addition to these threats, he undermined the power of independent agencies by cutting their budgets through the legislature. He also eliminated 109 state-controlled trust funds set up by past governments to safeguard dedicated public support for artists, academics, scientists, journalists and human rights defenders. In a violation of the constitution and fiscal code, López Obrador revealed the personal income data of journalist Carlos Loret de Mola, who reported on his son's luxurious life in Houston. The judicial branch has been weaponized with politicized investigations, with threats to incarcerate several professors and scientists on money laundering and organized crime charges in the maximum-security prison Reclusorio Norte. Furthermore, environmentially damaging and mostly opaque infrastructure projects have increased, including the construction of the Dos Bocas oil refinery in Tabasco and the Tren Maya in the Yucatán Peninsula.

As part of the United States–Mexico–Canada Agreement (USMCA), in July 2020, Mexico passed controversial amendments to its copyright law, causing serious human rights concerns from the National Human Rights Commission. These amendments implemented a notice and take down system that forces internet service providers to remove any content or publication that has been accused of violating copyright, even without any evidence of the infringement or a judicial authority. This system could be considered as an extrajudicial form of censorship since it conditions ISPs to implement unilateral content removal measures. Circumvention of technological protection measures is also broadly, vaguely and imprecisely banned, even if the circumvention is done in exercise of human rights. The mere dissemination of instructions is also disproportionately punished.

As a result, human rights organization R3D challenged the constitutionality of the 2020 amendments to the copyright law in the Supreme Court of Justice of the Nation (SCJN). However, the SCJN, in a 6–5 vote, upheld the controversial reforms because the law sanctions abusers of the instrument and provides a counter-notice system to restore the removed material. Still, a counter-notice is not automatic (in 15 business days) and even if it is restored, freedom of expression would already be damaged, especially in political contexts. R3D has described the decision as "favoring commercial interests without paying attention to the terrible implications that these reforms cause in freedom of expression, privacy, security, competition, the economy of consumers, technological autonomy and the environment, betraying its obligation as guarantor of human rights".

=== United States ===
The V-Dem Institute said in 2026 that "the speed with which American democracy is currently dismantled is unprecedented in modern history". The institute noted executive overreach undermining the rule of law, suppression and intimidation of media and dissenting voices, loss of legislative constraints, and declining civil rights, equality, and freedom of expression.

Beginning in October 2025, The New York Times editorial board published an Autocracy Index showing erosion of US democracy using various benchmarks, offering "a way to understand how much Mr. Trump is eroding American democracy" since his January 2025 inauguration.

Political scientists have identified democratic backsliding in the United States for several decades. In recent years, many have credited figures like Donald Trump and Newt Gingrich with playing key roles in undermining democratic norms in the United States and hastening political polarization and partisanship in politics and society.

The 2016 presidential candidacy and presidency of Donald Trump prompted grave concerns among political scientists regarding accelerated democratic backsliding in the United States. In a 2019 journal article, political scientists Robert C. Lieberman, Suzanne Mettler, and others wrote that Trump's presidency presented a threat to the American democratic order because it simultaneously brought together three specific trends—"polarized two-party presidentialism; a polity fundamentally divided over membership and status in the political community, in ways structured by race and economic inequality; and the erosion of democratic norms"—for the first time in American history. Lieberman noted that Donald Trump has "repeatedly challenged the very legitimacy of the basic mechanics and norms of the American electoral process, invoking the specter of mass voter fraud, encouraging voter suppression, selectively attacking the Electoral College, and even threatening to disrupt the peaceful transfer of power" and noted that "Never in the modern era has a presidential candidate threatened to lock up his opponent; castigated people so publicly and repeatedly on the basis of their country of origin, religion, sex, disability, or military service record; or operated with no evident regard for facts or truth." In 2020, political scientists Alexander Cooley and Daniel Nexon, wrote that "the Trump administration has consistently de-emphasized the importance of human rights and democracy in its rhetoric and while adopting language and tropes similar to those of right-wing, illiberal movements." Colley and Nexon cited Trump's praise of autocratic rulers, his echoing of ethno-nationalist rhetoric, his efforts to delegitimize journalism and journalists as "fake news" and his policies erecting new barriers to refugees and asylum-seekers as similar to politics "found in backsliding regimes".

Political scientist Pippa Norris wrote in 2021 that democratic backsliding under Trump culminated in his attempts to undermine the peaceful transfer of power and overturn the results of the 2020 presidential election, in which Trump was defeated by Joe Biden.

The 2019 annual democracy report of the V-Dem Institute at the University of Gothenburg found that the U.S. under Trump was among the world's liberal democracies experiencing "democratic erosion" (but not full-scale "democratic breakdown"). The report cited an increase in "polarization of society and disrespect in public deliberations" as well as Trump's attacks on the media and opposition and attempts to contain the judiciary and the legislature. The report concluded, however, that "American institutions appear to be withstanding these attempts to a significant degree", noting that Democrats had won a majority the House of Representatives in the 2018 midterm elections, which "seems to have reversed the trajectory of an increasingly unconstrained executive". The V-Dem Institute's 2020 report found that the U.S. had "registered a substantial decline in liberal democracy" under Trump; the report also found that "the United States of America is the only country in Western Europe and North America suffering from substantial autocratization."

According to a 2020 study in the American Political Science Review, Americans value democracy but are frequently willing to prioritize partisan political gains over democracy if the two are in conflict. Scholars have identified U.S. federalism, the urban-rural divide, and the emergence of white identity politics as key drivers behind democratic backsliding in the U.S.

In 2021 a Freedom House report rated the U.S. 83 out of 100, an 11-point drop from its rating of 94 out of 100 in 2011, with an accelerated drop of 6 points under the first Trump-term alone. Issues such as institutional racism in the United States in relation to criminal justice and voting rights, the negative influence of campaign finance which Freedom House views is damaging public trust in government, and increased political polarization in the United States due to the extreme use of partisan gerrymandering were cited as reasons for the decline in the United States' rating. In 2024, the Freedom House the US's score remained at 83/100, deeming the country free.

In 2021 the International Institute for Democracy and Electoral Assistance added the United States to their list of backsliding democracies, pointing to Trump's attempts to overturn the results of the 2020 election, as well as state voting laws that disproportionately impact minority groups.

Furthermore, stringent voter identification laws have been criticised for disproportionately impacting poor and ethnic minority voters in the US. A report published by the Brennan Center for Justice in 2011 stated ‘more than 1 in 10 voting-age citizens do not have current, government-issued photo ID. Some populations lack these documents at even higher rates: 25 percent of African-Americans, 16 percent of Hispanics, and 18 percent of Americans over age 65 do not have such ID’.

Turnout in US Elections has also been on a downward trend. Research conducted by the Pew Research Center in 2022 found that voter turnout in the US may have risen in the 2018 mid-term elections and the 2020 presidential election, it still trails behind many other countries. The American Presidency Project, conducted by UC Santa Barbara, found that US presidential election turnout has fluctuated between 49.9% and 60.9% between 1980 and 2020.

Women's reproductive freedoms have become increasingly controversial since the reversal of Roe v Wade in 2022 by the US Supreme Court. By 2023, 14 states enacted near-total abortion bans from the moment of conception; affecting nearly 22 million women. Research conducted by the Pew Research Center in 2022 found that 62% of people said that 'abortion should be legal in all or most cases'.

Licence to discriminate laws has allowed discrimination against the LGBTQ community. This allows, for example, the refusal of healthcare provision based on moral or religious objections. The Human Rights Watch found in 2018 that ‘these laws fail to balance moral and religious objections to LGBT relationships and identities with the rights of LGBT people themselves’.

Following the return of Trump to the U.S. presidency in 2025, the expansion of executive power and the reduction of agency workforces and regulations by the Department of Government Efficiency has been described as having "raised fears of a threat to US democracy". Freedom House has described the pardon of January 6 United States Capitol attack defendants as an attempt to "excuse a violent assault on a key element of democracy". Political scientists, scholars, and others have increasingly characterized Trump's actions as authoritarian and fascist, such as Steven Levitsky, who found the first two months of the second Trump administration to be the most aggressively and openly authoritarian case of democratic backsliding that he has seen, expressing particular concern about attacks on the courts. Similarly, Ray Dalio, the founder of Bridgewater Associates, has warned that the United States is heading towards 1930s-style authoritarian policies.

== Central America ==
=== El Salvador ===
El Salvador has been described as undergoing democratic backsliding after the election of President Nayib Bukele, particularly following the 2020 crisis, when Bukele sent Salvadoran Army soldiers into the Legislative Assembly to pressure and intimidate members of the Assembly. In a June 2020 report, the V-Dem Institute wrote that El Salvador was "at high risk of pandemic backsliding" and that the country was one of several countries with "severe" violations of democratic standards of emergency measures, including: arbitrary mass arrests by security forces of persons deemed to violate social distancing rules (in contravention of a number of decisions of the Supreme Court).

In May 2021, supporters of Bukele in the Legislative Assembly dismissed El Salvador's judges of the Supreme Court and the Attorney General. The Organization of American States condemned the dismissals, declaring that they were undermining democratic principles.

In September 2021, Bukele-appointed judges ruled that Bukele could run for a second term, despite El Salvador's constitutional prohibition on serving two consecutive terms in office.

The U.S. chargé d' affaires ad interim to El Salvador, Jean Elizabeth Manes, has said that the actions of the Bukele government have led to deteriorating relations with the United States, stating, "We simply can't look away when there's a decline in democracy".

Since March 2022, El Salvador has had a State of Exception, suspending certain civil liberties, including due process.

In September 2022, Chilean president Gabriel Boric described an "authoritarian drift" in El Salvador which he warned was "undermining democracy" in the name of fighting crime.

In August 2025, the El Salvador Legislative Assembly abolished presidential term limits, paving the way for Bukele to pursue indefinite re-election.

=== Guatemala ===
Attempts by President Jimmy Morales to end the United Nations International Commission against Impunity in Guatemala have been described by Sanne Weber as having "raised serious doubts about democracy in the Central American country".

In May 2022, the United States government banned Guatemalan Attorney General María Consuelo Porras from the entering the U.S., with U.S. Secretary of State Antony Blinken stating, "Attorney General Porras's corrupt acts undermine democracy in Guatemala". Morales' successor, President Alejandro Giammattei, was accused of democratic backsliding by Human Rights Watch after his reappointment of Porras.

The Los Angeles Times has reported that there is "a growing wave of attacks on Guatemala's courts that have forced more than 20 judges and prosecutors into exile", with political analyst Edgar Gutiérrez accusing the Guatemalan government under President Alejandro Giammattei of "constructing an authoritarian state".

In 2023, liberal opposition candidate Bernardo Arévalo won the presidential elections and was inaugurated in 2024 despite massive interruption.

=== Honduras ===
The Organization of American States (OAS) was critical of the conduct of the 2017 Honduran general election, noting irregularities in its conduct and calling for fresh elections. Following a decision by the Supreme Electoral Tribunal, the election was won by President Juan Orlando Hernández, who had run for a second term following the Honduran Supreme Court's decision to allow the President of the country to run for re-election. The tenure of Hernández and the National Party of Honduras has been described by Patricio Navia and Lucas Perelló as a period of democratic backsliding, with Perelló claiming that Hernández and the National Party of Honduras had "dismantled democratic institutions" in Honduras. Hernández has also been accused of "human rights violations" and "extrajudicial killings".

Hernández also pursued close ties with Nicaraguan President Daniel Ortega, despite ideological differences between the right-wing Hernández and left-wing Ortega, opposing or abstaining on resolutions condemning Nicaraguan actions at the OAS.

Hernández subsequently followed constitutional term limits and chose not to run for a third term, and the National Party lost the 2021 Honduran general election.

=== Nicaragua ===
Nicaragua under President Daniel Ortega has been described by Lucas Perelló and Patricio Navia as undergoing democratic backsliding, leading Ortega's Sandinista National Liberation Front to have a "dominant status" in the country's politics. Ortega has enacted changes that have reduced the capacity for Nicaraguans to make claims against the government.

After rising to power, Ortega ratified indefinite elections in 2014 that have now allowed Ortega to serve on his fourth consecutive term. Although opposition parties rival him, Ortega has concentrated power by hosting elections that many deem as fraudulent and banning opposition party leaders from standing by the Nicaragua Supreme Court. Following Ortega's 2021 election, the United States, Canada, and the United Kingdom imposed sanctions on Nicaragua over the fraudulent election.

Ortega has cracked down on civil society, where he motivated the military to use lethal violence on protestors in April 2018. Prior to the 2021 Nicaraguan general election, Nicaragua jailed opposition figures and journalists under a new treason law. In 2022, Ortega has intensified a crackdown on the Catholic Church by banning processions, arresting priests, and shutting down Catholic radio stations.

In July 2026, Ortega cancelled the next Nicaraguan general election.

== South America ==
=== Argentina ===
Argentine President Javier Milei proposed in March 2024 to allow the armed forces to participate in domestic security operations to counter crime in Rosario, a measure that was opposed by his own Vice President Victoria Villarruel and was controversial given the historic use of the military to suppress dissent during the National Reorganization Process military dictatorship.

Milei has been accused by Human Rights Watch of "one of the most serious attacks against the independence of the Supreme Court in Argentina since the return of democracy" through his February 2025 appointments of Supreme Court judges by decree, bypassing the Argentine National Congress.

In January 2026, Milei issued a decree expanding the powers of intelligence officers and allowing them to make arrests on the spot, sparking concerns from the opposition that intelligence agencies could be used for political espionage.

=== Bolivia ===
Former President Evo Morales was described by Oliver Stuenkel of the Carnegie Endowment for International Peace as leading a "slow erosion of democracy" in Bolivia, claiming that Morales was "exerting tighter control over the judiciary and the opposition media".

The 2019 Bolivian political crisis, when the Bolivian Armed Forces compelled President Morales to resign, was described by Javier Corrales as "one of the few examples of democratic backsliding in which the government ends defeated". However, other analysts, such as Robert Carlson, have noted that acting President Jeanine Áñez "repeatedly delayed elections after a tumultuous transfer of power", describing this an example of pandemic-era democratic backsliding. Áñez and her ministers were later jailed on terrorism and sedition charges, which she described as a "political prosecution", with Human Rights Watch noting the arrest warrants "contain no evidence whatsoever that they have committed the crime of terrorism".

=== Brazil ===
Political scientist Robert Muggah argued in Foreign Policy that Brazil was undergoing backsliding under President Jair Bolsonaro, noting Bolsonaro's criticisms of the judiciary and the electoral system, and his participation in anti-democratic rallies. Bolsonaro has often used Rodrigo Duterte and Donald Trump as a model to effect democratic backsliding in Brazil.

In July 2021, Bolsonaro threatened to cancel the 2022 Brazilian general election, claiming election fraud would take place unless the electoral system was reformed.

In August 2021, Bolsonaro described "three alternatives for [his] future", which he said were "being arrested, killed or victory" in the 2022 election.

Following his defeat in the 2022 election, Bolsonaro declined to concede, although he allowed a transition to take place to incoming President Lula da Silva. The 2023 Brazilian Congress attack which followed was described as an instance of democratic backsliding.

The Brazilian Supreme Court has also been accused of undemocratic actions. In 2019, magazine Crusoé published a report accusing the Supreme Court's president, Dias Toffoli, of being involved in the corruption scandal Operation Car Wash. Toffoli granted the court a new power to launch an inquiry to investigate personal attacks and statements against court members, a move that was called as "act as an investigator, prosecutor and judge all at once in some cases" by the New York Times. Toffoli named justice Alexandre de Moraes as the inquiry instructor. Moraes ordered Crusoé to remove the article from their website, calling it "fake news". After being criticized by journalist organizations, and after being presented with legal documents that showed the article was accurate, he rescinded the order.

According to the New York Times, since grating itself this new power, the country's Supreme Court, through justice Moraes, has ordered major social networks to remove dozens of accounts, erasing thousands of their posts, often without giving a reason. In seven cases, Moraes ordered the arrest of far-right activists on charges of threatening democracy by advocating for a coup or calling people to antidemocratic rallies. Some cases were initiated by the attorney general's office, while others Mr. Moraes began himself.

With Moraes orders affecting right-wing activists and social media profiles, president Jair Bolsonaro attacked Moraes in speeches, tried and failed to get him impeached in Congress and told supporters during a rally he would not abide by Mr. Moraes's rulings, though he later walked back and apologized the next day.

In 2022, Moraes assumed the presidency of the Supreme Elections Court, Brazil's court that oversees elections. The 2022 presidential elections saw unprecedented oversight over social media by the court. During the campaigns, the court had ordered the removal of at least 334 social media posts deemed "fake news", from platforms like Facebook, Instagram, Twitter, Telegram, WhatsApp, TikTok, Kwai and Gettr. In October, days before the presidential election run-off, the court prohibited a documentary about the presidential candidates by Brasil Paralelo from being released until after the election, by a 4 to 3 vote. In the dissent, justices called the decision censorship, while the concurrents, including Moraes himself, denied it.

In 2020, a bill aimed at combating "fake news" and other forms of misinformation in social media, called Projeto de Lei 2630/2020, passed the Brazilian Senate. In 2023, the bill picked up again in Chamber of Deputies. Moraes supported the bill and asked the Senate president for changes to the bill. Platforms like Google, Facebook, Instagram, WhatsApp, Twitter and TikTok publicly spoke against the bill in an open letter and spoke against it to its users. Moraes ordered the platforms to remove their publications made to its users and subpoenaed them to testify about it.

=== Ecuador ===
Ecuadorian President Daniel Noboa has been accused of democratic backsliding following his declaration of a state of emergency during the 2024 Ecuadorian conflict, with the Ecuadorian Constitutional Court repeatedly ruling against the declaration.

Researchers at the Center for Economic and Policy Research have described Noboa's government as displaying "clear signs of authoritarianism and a disregard for the rule of law, constitutional practices and rights", citing his refusal to step down during the 30-day electoral campaign period and 2024 raid on the Mexican embassy in Ecuador.

=== Peru ===
Peru has undergone significant democratic backsliding since 2011, when Ollanta Humala took power. The Congress of the Republic, which was back then controlled by the right-wing opposition, began to obstruct Humala's actions. As a result, Humala was essentially left powerless and led a very weak presidency. When Pedro Pablo Kuczynski was elected in 2016, the right-wing Popular Force party and its allied Popular Alliance gained an absolute majority in Congress, with the two gaining a combined 78 seats in Congress out of 130. As a result, Kuczynski's actions were heavily obstructed by Congress, who censured his appointed cabinet and attempted to impeach him. Corruption was also rife during this period, shown in the pardon of Alberto Fujimori, which was done for political favors. After a vote buying scandal emerged in March 2018 amidst a second attempt to impeach Kuczynski, he resigned and was succeeded by his vice president, Martín Vizcarra.

Vizcarra led a more confrontational approach with Congress, and passed several anti-corruption reforms. In September 2019, he dissolved Congress and snap elections were held in January 2020 which led to Popular Force and the Popular Alliance to lose its absolute majority, however, the right-wing still held considerable power over the president. As a result of a plummeting economy and the COVID-19 pandemic, Congress attempted to impeach him twice, and he was successfully removed after the second attempt in November 2020. Manuel Merino assumed the presidency under controversy for his handling the impeachment proceedings, as unrest broke out. Merino resigned after 5 days in power and was replaced with Francisco Sagasti, who also faced tensions with Congress.

The problem of democratic backsliding arose sharply during the 2021 Peruvian general election after candidates Keiko Fujimori and Rafael López Aliaga launched smear campaigns against front runner Pedro Castillo, who was a leftist and held opposing views to them. After Castillo won the second round, Fujimori and her allies attempted to overturn the election, alleging fraud while not conceding. These claims, while not supported by evidence, was supported by other prominent conservatives such as Vladimiro Montesinos, who aided the overturn attempts while imprisoned. Days before Castillo was to be inaugurated, Fujimori finally conceded and the National Office of Electoral Processes officially declared Castillo as the winner. However, Castillo's presidency was heavily obstructed by the right-wing Congress, much like his predecessors. This resulted in several instances of civil unrest and two removal attempts. Following the beginning of a third vacancy process against him, Castillo illegally attempted to execute a self-coup, which ended in his arrest and removal from the presidency. Castillo was replaced by his vice president, Dina Boluarte. Boluarte immediately began to betray her constituents, turning towards Congress while also consolidating power within the Judiciary, Armed Forces, National Police, and other governing institutions which were packed by Fujimorists and other right-wing allies of Boluarte, which led to civil unrest. The ensuing bloody crackdown led to over 80 deaths and was concurrent with allegations of human rights abuses, torture, and arbitrary killings.

=== Uruguay ===
The International Institute for Democracy and Electoral Assistance noted that Uruguay had experienced some democratic declines in rule of law and civil liberties from 2019 to 2024.

=== Venezuela ===
V-Dem Democracy Indices for electoral democracy (solid) and liberal democracy (dotted) for Venezuela

Since the late 1990s, Venezuela has undergone a significant backslide in democratic institutions. Chavismo propelled democratic backsliding in Venezuela.

From 1958 onward, Venezuela was considered to be a relatively stable democracy within a continent that was facing a wave of military dictatorship, consuming almost all Latin American countries in the 1970s. Until the early 1980s, it was one of Latin America's four most prosperous states; with an upper-middle economy, and a stable centre-left democracy. The collapse of the oil market in the 1980s left Venezuela (a major crude oil exporter) in great debt.

In the 1990s, during the second term of Carlos Andrés Pérez and the term of his successor Rafael Caldera, the country implemented market-oriented strategies in order to receive monetary aid from the International Monetary Fund, cuts spending on social programs, and eliminated price controls on consumer goods and gas, which caused social unrest and high inflation. Hugo Chávez won the presidency in December 1998 by appealing to the desires of the poor and pledging economic reforms and by a popular movement that aimed to strengthen grassroots democracy. After Chávez won the election, checks and balances on the power of the executive branch were reduced significantly, following a relatively stable pattern between 1999 and 2003. Chávez proposed to rewrite the constitution by a constituent assembly in 1999, shortly after arriving in office. After enabling himself to legally rewrite the constitution and therewith amending a presidential term from five to six years, with a single reelection, Chávez gained full control over the military branch. This allowed him to determine military promotions, and eliminate the Senate. As a result, he no longer required legislative approval. The weakening of political institutions and increased government corruption transformed Venezuela into a personal dictatorship.

Chavez's dominance of the media (including a constant presence on television) and his charismatic personality contributed to democratic backsliding in Venezuela, in addition to constitutional revisions that concentrated Chávez's power and diminished the executive's accountability.

A rapid increase in crude oil prices around 2003 fueled economic growth in the country, allowing Chávez and his party to further entrench their dominance. By 2004, Chávez had gained full authority over the democracy-sustaining institutions, diminishing checks and balances and the power of the National Assembly. Accusing traditional parties of causing the initial economic distress through exploitation of the country, he justified the weakening of non-executive branches by arguing that those branches were dominated by the traditional parties, and therefore unreliable. After Chávez' death in 2013, his successor Nicolás Maduro continued an authoritarian style of governance. After the Venezuelan opposition won a majority of the National Assembly in the 2015 elections, Maduro and his allies retained control of the other key levers of power, including the military, state-run oil company, Supreme Court, and National Electoral Council. In 2017, Maduro and his allies, moved to circumvent the opposition-controlled National Assembly by creating a Constituent National Assembly, dominated by government loyalists, and declaring it the supreme organ of state power. This move further intensified Venezuela's democratic backsliding. Currently, Venezuela is an authoritarian regime, and had even been described as a personal dictatorship.

== See also ==
- Democracy in the Americas
