= Democracy in Asia =

V-Dem Electoral Democracy Index in Asia for year 2025: 0.90–1.00 0.80–0.89 0.70–0.79 0.60–0.69 / 0.50–0.59 0.40–0.49 0.30–0.39 0.20–0.29 / 0.10–0.19 0.00–0.09 No data

Democracy in Asia can be comparatively assessed according to various definitions of democracy. According to the V-Dem Democracy indices, the Asian countries with the highest democracy scores in year 2025 were Taiwan, Japan, South Korea, Cyprus and Sri Lanka, meanwhile the Asian countries with lowest democracy scores in 2023 are Saudi Arabia, Qatar and Afghanistan. Democratic backsliding can be observed in parts of Asia. The V-Dem Democracy Report identified for the year 2025 Timor Leste, Thailand and Sri Lanka as a cases of ongoing democratization.

== By country ==
- Democracy in Afghanistan
- Democracy in Bangladesh
- Democracy in Bhutan
- Democracy in China
  - Democracy in Hong Kong
- Democracy in India
- Democracy in Iraq
- Democracy in Pakistan

== Measures of democracy ==
The table below shows Asian countries scored on V-Dem Democracy indices for year 2024.

V-Dem Democracy Indices
Country	Democracy Indices		Democracy Component Indices			
Country	Electoral	Liberal	Liberal	Egalitarian	Participatory	Deliberative
Japan	0.82	0.73	0.9	0.94	0.56	0.9
South Korea	0.82	0.74	0.91	0.87	0.61	0.94
Taiwan	0.8	0.7	0.89	0.88	0.8	0.86
Sri Lanka	0.78	0.61	0.76	0.71	0.61	0.78
East Timor	0.74	0.55	0.71	0.58	0.56	0.7
Israel	0.69	0.59	0.85	0.78	0.6	0.71
Nepal	0.66	0.5	0.75	0.58	0.62	0.54
Armenia	0.61	0.37	0.53	0.78	0.42	0.55
Bhutan	0.57	0.46	0.79	0.81	0.55	0.9
Maldives	0.56	0.42	0.72	0.61	0.49	0.72
Mongolia	0.54	0.42	0.76	0.66	0.43	0.83
Malaysia	0.5	0.36	0.64	0.71	0.53	0.66
Indonesia	0.46	0.3	0.56	0.45	0.57	0.74
Singapore	0.43	0.36	0.77	0.79	0.14	0.75
Thailand	0.42	0.31	0.67	0.49	0.33	0.35
Lebanon	0.42	0.27	0.54	0.5	0.42	0.76
Philippines	0.39	0.29	0.64	0.31	0.56	0.54
India	0.38	0.26	0.57	0.41	0.54	0.57
Iraq	0.37	0.22	0.48	0.41	0.49	0.62
Kyrgyzstan	0.31	0.18	0.42	0.59	0.37	0.32
Pakistan	0.3	0.18	0.42	0.26	0.47	0.43
Turkey	0.29	0.11	0.23	0.54	0.4	0.13
Jordan	0.28	0.27	0.76	0.56	0.31	0.74
Kazakhstan	0.26	0.13	0.33	0.56	0.25	0.5
Uzbekistan	0.22	0.08	0.19	0.44	0.2	0.45
Bangladesh	0.2	0.12	0.34	0.33	0.28	0.48
Cambodia	0.18	0.05	0.12	0.24	0.15	0.22
Oman	0.18	0.14	0.44	0.56	0.37	0.21
Azerbaijan	0.17	0.05	0.13	0.39	0.1	0.07
Russia	0.17	0.06	0.15	0.41	0.39	0.16
Iran	0.16	0.1	0.32	0.5	0.1	0.28
Tajikistan	0.16	0.04	0.11	0.17	0.16	0.12
Turkmenistan	0.15	0.03	0.08	0.27	0.08	0.06
Vietnam	0.15	0.1	0.33	0.55	0.56	0.62
Bahrain	0.14	0.06	0.19	0.43	0.16	0.18
Kuwait	0.14	0.13	0.43	0.59	0.15	0.6
Laos	0.14	0.11	0.36	0.38	0.4	0.18
Syria	0.13	0.05	0.17	0.43	0.18	0.59
Yemen	0.13	0.04	0.12	0.09	0.23	0.11
United Arab Emirates	0.1	0.08	0.26	0.44	0.09	0.29
North Korea	0.08	0.01	0.03	0.34	0.15	0.02
Myanmar	0.08	0.02	0.04	0.2	0.14	0.12
China	0.07	0.04	0.14	0.29	0.12	0.23
Afghanistan	0.07	0.02	0.06	0.05	0.18	0.03
Qatar	0.03	0.09	0.35	0.39	0.13	0.47
Saudi Arabia	0.02	0.05	0.18	0.45	0.1	0.28

== See also ==
- Democracy in Africa
- Democracy in the Americas
- Democracy in Europe
- Democracy in the Middle East and North Africa
- Democratic backsliding by country – Asia
