= Third wave =

Third wave may refer to:

== Movements ==
- Third-wave feminism, diverse strains of feminist activity in the early 1990s
- Third-wave democracy, the third major surge of democracy in history
- The third wave of cognitive behavioral therapy
- Third-wave coffee, a term associated with higher-quality, specialty coffee

== Entertainment ==
=== Books ===
- The Third Wave (Toffler book), 1980 non-fiction book by Alvin Toffler
- The Third Wave of the Holy Spirit, 1988 book by C. Peter Wagner
- The Third Wave: Democratization in the Late Twentieth Century, 1991 book by Samuel P. Huntington

=== Music ===
- Third wave ska, a musical genre
- Third Wave (album), a 2002 studio album by The Telescopes
- The Third Wave, an album mixed by DJs Scott Brown and Neophyte

=== Film ===
- The Third Wave (2003 film), a Swedish action film
- The Third Wave (2007 film), a documentary about the aftermath of the 2004 tsunami in Sri Lanka
- The Cured, a 2017 Irish horror film directed by David Freyne previously titled The Third Wave

== Other ==
- The Third Wave (experiment), a name given to an experimental recreation of Nazi Germany conducted with high school students
- WAVE (TV), a television station in Louisville, Kentucky, on channel number 3
