= Democracy in the Americas =

Map of V-Dem Electoral Democracy Index in the Americas for 2024: 0.900–1.000 0.800–0.899 0.700–0.799 0.600–0.699 / 0.500–0.599 0.400–0.499 0.300–0.399 0.200–0.299 / 0.100–0.199 0.000–0.099 No data

The Democracy in the Americas can be compared according to the different definitions of democracy. The V-Dem Democracy indices considers countries in the Americas with the highest democracy scores in 2023 as Argentina, Canada, Chile, Costa Rica, Uruguay, USA and Jamaica and countries with lowest democracy scores as Nicaragua, Cuba and Venezuela. Democratic backsliding can be observed in parts of the Americas. Democratization is reported by V-Dem Democracy Report 2024 in Brazil, Dominican Republic, Honduras and Bolivia.

== Measures of democracy ==
The table below shows countries in the Americas scored on 2 high-level V-Dem Democracy indices and 4 mid-level Democracy Component indices published in 2025 evaluating the state of democracy in year 2024.

V-Dem Democracy Indices
Country	Democracy Indices		Democracy Component Indices			
Country	Electoral	Liberal	Liberal	Egalitarian	Participatory	Deliberative
Costa Rica	0.859	0.805	0.952	0.885	0.641	0.931
Uruguay	0.848	0.769	0.912	0.777	0.815	0.842
Chile	0.844	0.787	0.949	0.719	0.644	0.94
Canada	0.842	0.744	0.887	0.699	0.632	0.753
United States of America	0.84	0.748	0.89	0.667	0.655	0.884
Jamaica	0.803	0.684	0.848	0.787	0.604	0.731
Brazil	0.801	0.712	0.9	0.617	0.628	0.944
Barbados	0.786	0.67	0.848	0.842	0.298	0.926
Suriname	0.768	0.637	0.821	0.715	0.581	0.764
Trinidad and Tobago	0.755	0.627	0.826	0.786	0.582	0.925
Panama	0.726	0.584	0.794	0.576	0.524	0.737
Argentina	0.712	0.553	0.76	0.73	0.591	0.535
Dominican Republic	0.705	0.45	0.571	0.471	0.595	0.818
Colombia	0.701	0.557	0.779	0.528	0.634	0.645
Ecuador	0.651	0.446	0.639	0.366	0.754	0.442
Peru	0.634	0.493	0.761	0.509	0.604	0.405
Guatemala	0.597	0.469	0.768	0.327	0.594	0.594
Paraguay	0.579	0.388	0.618	0.312	0.516	0.458
Bolivia	0.576	0.314	0.461	0.593	0.628	0.473
Honduras	0.541	0.382	0.658	0.408	0.537	0.687
Mexico	0.505	0.251	0.397	0.438	0.617	0.423
Guyana	0.491	0.315	0.568	0.675	0.516	0.378
El Salvador	0.339	0.092	0.137	0.264	0.451	0.268
Haiti	0.218	0.079	0.192	0.128	0.259	0.592
Venezuela	0.197	0.049	0.101	0.263	0.492	0.023
Cuba	0.178	0.055	0.138	0.753	0.17	0.286
Nicaragua	0.153	0.019	0.022	0.271	0.295	0.017

=== Survey data ===
A 2024 Pew Research Survey of people in 34 countries found that 21% agreed with the statement "democracy in the United States is a good example to follow." Forty percent of respondents agreed that democracy in the United States used to be a good example to follow, but in recent years no longer is.

== See also ==
=== By country ===
- Democracy in the United States
- Chilean transition to democracy
- Democracy in Mexico
- Democracy in Venezuela
- Redemocratization in Brazil

=== By region ===
- Democracy in Africa
- Democracy in Asia
- Democracy in Europe
- Democracy in the Middle East and North Africa
- Democratic backsliding by country – Americas
