= Rheingau-Taunus – Limburg =

Federal electoral district of Germany

177 Rheingau-Taunus – Limburg
- Electoral district for the Bundestag
- Rheingau-Taunus – Limburg in 2025
- State: Hesse
- Population: 298,000 (2019)
- Electorate: 220,466 (2021)
- Major settlements: Limburg an der Lahn; Taunusstein; Idstein
- Area: 1,171.2 km^{2}

Current electoral district
- Created: 1949
- Party: CDU
- Member: Klaus-Peter Willsch
- Elected: 1998, 2002, 2005, 2009, 2013, 2017, 2021, 2025

Rheingau-Taunus – Limburg is an electoral constituency (German: Wahlkreis) represented in the Bundestag. It elects one member via first-past-the-post voting. Under the current constituency numbering system, it is designated as constituency 177. It is located in southwestern Hesse, comprising the Rheingau-Taunus-Kreis district and the southwestern part of the Limburg-Weilburg district.

Rheingau-Taunus – Limburg was created for the inaugural 1949 federal election. Since 1998, it has been represented by Klaus-Peter Willsch of the Christian Democratic Union (CDU).

== Geography ==
Rheingau-Taunus – Limburg is located in southwestern Hesse. As of the 2021 federal election, it comprises the entirety of the Rheingau-Taunus-Kreis district as well as the Limburg-Weilburg district excluding the municipalities of Beselich, Löhnberg, Mengerskirchen, Merenberg, Runkel, Villmar, Weilburg, Weilmünster, and Weinbach.

== History ==
Rheingau-Taunus – Limburg was created in 1949, then known as Limburg. It acquired its current name in the 1980 election. In the 1949 election, it was Hesse constituency 12 in the numbering system. From 1953 through 1976, it was number 137. From 1980 through 1998, it was number 135. In the 2002 and 2005 elections, it was number 179. In the 2009 through 2021 elections, it was number 178. From the 2025 election, it has been number 177.

Originally, the constituency comprised the districts of Rheingaukreis, Untertaunuskreis, and Limburg. It acquired its current borders in the 1976 election.

Election	No.	Name	Borders
1949	12	Limburg	Rheingaukreis district; Untertaunuskreis district; Limburg district
1953	137	Limburg	Rheingaukreis district; Untertaunuskreis district; Limburg district
1957	137	Limburg	Rheingaukreis district; Untertaunuskreis district; Limburg district
1961	137	Limburg	Rheingaukreis district; Untertaunuskreis district; Limburg district
1965	137	Limburg	Rheingaukreis district; Untertaunuskreis district; Limburg district
1969	137	Limburg	Rheingaukreis district; Untertaunuskreis district; Limburg district
1972	137	Limburg	Rheingaukreis district; Untertaunuskreis district; Limburg district
1976	137	Limburg	Rheingau-Taunus-Kreis district; Limburg-Weilburg district (excluding Beselich, Löhnberg, Mengerskirchen, Merenberg, Runkel, Villmar, Weilburg, Weilmünster, and Weinbach municipalities)
1980	135	Rheingau-Taunus – Limburg	Rheingau-Taunus-Kreis district; Limburg-Weilburg district (excluding Beselich, Löhnberg, Mengerskirchen, Merenberg, Runkel, Villmar, Weilburg, Weilmünster, and Weinbach municipalities)
1983	135	Rheingau-Taunus – Limburg	Rheingau-Taunus-Kreis district; Limburg-Weilburg district (excluding Beselich, Löhnberg, Mengerskirchen, Merenberg, Runkel, Villmar, Weilburg, Weilmünster, and Weinbach municipalities)
1987	135	Rheingau-Taunus – Limburg	Rheingau-Taunus-Kreis district; Limburg-Weilburg district (excluding Beselich, Löhnberg, Mengerskirchen, Merenberg, Runkel, Villmar, Weilburg, Weilmünster, and Weinbach municipalities)
1990	135	Rheingau-Taunus – Limburg	Rheingau-Taunus-Kreis district; Limburg-Weilburg district (excluding Beselich, Löhnberg, Mengerskirchen, Merenberg, Runkel, Villmar, Weilburg, Weilmünster, and Weinbach municipalities)
1994	135	Rheingau-Taunus – Limburg	Rheingau-Taunus-Kreis district; Limburg-Weilburg district (excluding Beselich, Löhnberg, Mengerskirchen, Merenberg, Runkel, Villmar, Weilburg, Weilmünster, and Weinbach municipalities)
1998	135	Rheingau-Taunus – Limburg	Rheingau-Taunus-Kreis district; Limburg-Weilburg district (excluding Beselich, Löhnberg, Mengerskirchen, Merenberg, Runkel, Villmar, Weilburg, Weilmünster, and Weinbach municipalities)
2002	179	Rheingau-Taunus – Limburg	Rheingau-Taunus-Kreis district; Limburg-Weilburg district (excluding Beselich, Löhnberg, Mengerskirchen, Merenberg, Runkel, Villmar, Weilburg, Weilmünster, and Weinbach municipalities)
2005	179	Rheingau-Taunus – Limburg	Rheingau-Taunus-Kreis district; Limburg-Weilburg district (excluding Beselich, Löhnberg, Mengerskirchen, Merenberg, Runkel, Villmar, Weilburg, Weilmünster, and Weinbach municipalities)
2009	178	Rheingau-Taunus – Limburg	Rheingau-Taunus-Kreis district; Limburg-Weilburg district (excluding Beselich, Löhnberg, Mengerskirchen, Merenberg, Runkel, Villmar, Weilburg, Weilmünster, and Weinbach municipalities)
2013	178	Rheingau-Taunus – Limburg	Rheingau-Taunus-Kreis district; Limburg-Weilburg district (excluding Beselich, Löhnberg, Mengerskirchen, Merenberg, Runkel, Villmar, Weilburg, Weilmünster, and Weinbach municipalities)
2017	178	Rheingau-Taunus – Limburg	Rheingau-Taunus-Kreis district; Limburg-Weilburg district (excluding Beselich, Löhnberg, Mengerskirchen, Merenberg, Runkel, Villmar, Weilburg, Weilmünster, and Weinbach municipalities)
2021	178	Rheingau-Taunus – Limburg	Rheingau-Taunus-Kreis district; Limburg-Weilburg district (excluding Beselich, Löhnberg, Mengerskirchen, Merenberg, Runkel, Villmar, Weilburg, Weilmünster, and Weinbach municipalities)
2025	177	Rheingau-Taunus – Limburg	Rheingau-Taunus-Kreis district; Limburg-Weilburg district (excluding Beselich, Löhnberg, Mengerskirchen, Merenberg, Runkel, Villmar, Weilburg, Weilmünster, and Weinbach municipalities)

== Members ==
The constituency has been held continuously by the Christian Democratic Union (CDU) since its creation. It was first represented by Josef Arndgen from 1949 to 1965. He was succeeded by Benno Erhard from 1965 to 1987. Michael Jung then served from 1987 to 1998. Klaus-Peter Willsch was elected in 1998, and re-elected in 2002, 2005, 2009, 2013, 2017, and 2021.

Election	Member	Party	%
1949	Josef Arndgen	CDU	38.6
1953	Josef Arndgen	CDU	48.6
1957	Josef Arndgen	CDU	58.2
1961	Josef Arndgen	CDU	51.1
1965	Benno Erhard	CDU	52.2
1969	Benno Erhard	CDU	50.1
1972	Benno Erhard	CDU	50.6
1976	Benno Erhard	CDU	53.0
1980	Benno Erhard	CDU	47.7
1983	Benno Erhard	CDU	54.6
1987	Michael Jung	CDU	50.9
1990	Michael Jung	CDU	51.2
1994	Michael Jung	CDU	54.0
1998	Klaus-Peter Willsch	CDU	46.8
2002	Klaus-Peter Willsch	CDU	47.4
2005	Klaus-Peter Willsch	CDU	47.5
2009	Klaus-Peter Willsch	CDU	46.1
2013	Klaus-Peter Willsch	CDU	52.1
2017	Klaus-Peter Willsch	CDU	41.8
2021	Klaus-Peter Willsch	CDU	30.2
2025	Klaus-Peter Willsch	CDU	36.8

== Election results ==
=== 2025 election ===
Federal election (2025): Rheingau-Taunus – Limburg
Notes:	Blue background denotes the winner of the electorate vote. Pink background denotes a candidate elected from their party list. Yellow background denotes an electorate win by a list member, or other incumbent. A ✓ or ✗ denotes status of any incumbent, win or lose respectively.						
Party	Candidate	Votes	%	±%	Party votes	%	±%
CDU	✓ Klaus-Peter Willsch	66,650	36.8	▲6.6	60,697	33.4	▲7.4
SPD	Martin Rabanus	40,099	22.1	▼6.4	30,839	17.0	▼8.7
AfD	Jan Feser	31,376	17.3	▲9.4	31,944	17.6	▲9.1
Greens	Ayse Asar	19,472	10.8	▼3.6	22,142	12.2	▼2.7
Left	Finn Köllner	9,026	5.0	▲2.3	11,453	6.3	▲3.1
FDP	Alexander Müller	7,660	4.2	▼6.4	10,177	5.6	▼8.3
BSW					6,731	3.7	New
Tierschutzpartei					2,363	1.3	▼0.3
FW	Jörg Leichhammer	3,890	2.1	▼1.4	2,174	1.2	▼0.8
Volt	Niklas Debusmann	2,888	1.6	New	1,646	0.9	▲0.4
PARTEI					915	0.5	▼0.3
BD					311	0.2	New
Humanists					148	0.1	0.0
MLPD					38	<0.1	0.0
Informal votes		1,725			1,208		
Total valid votes		181,061			181,578		
Turnout		182,786	84.2	▲6.1			
CDU hold	Majority	26,551	14.7	▲13.0			

=== 2021 election ===
Federal election (2021): Rheingau-Taunus – Limburg
Notes:	Blue background denotes the winner of the electorate vote. Pink background denotes a candidate elected from their party list. Yellow background denotes an electorate win by a list member, or other incumbent. A ✓ or ✗ denotes status of any incumbent, win or lose respectively.						
Party	Candidate	Votes	%	±%	Party votes	%	±%
CDU	✓ Klaus-Peter Willsch	51,318	30.2	▼11.6	44,413	26.1	▼8.5
SPD	Martin Rabanus	48,441	28.5	▲3.2	43,708	25.6	▲4.9
Greens	Anna Lührmann	24,418	14.4	▲7.4	25,328	14.9	▲6.0
FDP	Alexander Müller	18,126	10.7	▲3.0	23,745	13.9	▲0.7
AfD	Marcus Resch	13,547	8.0	▼2.2	14,523	8.5	▼3.4
FW	Bianka Rössler	6,103	3.6	▲1.0	3,466	2.0	▲1.0
Left	Zill Valentin	4,563	2.7	▼2.8	5,395	3.2	▼3.3
Tierschutzpartei					2,772	1.6	▲0.6
dieBasis	Jens Meyer	2,671	1.6		2,386	1.4	
PARTEI					1,357	0.8	0.0
Volt					830	0.5	
Pirates					661	0.4	▲0.1
Team Todenhöfer					546	0.3	
Independent	Carsten Schlossbauer	461	0.3				
Gesundheitsforschung					245	0.1	
Bündnis C	Reinhard Seiler	332	0.2		220	0.1	
NPD					195	0.1	▼0.1
Humanists					186	0.1	
V-Partei3					178	0.1	▼0.1
ÖDP					159	0.1	0.0
LKR					55	0.0	
Bündnis 21					54	0.0	
DKP					36	0.0	0.0
MLPD					24	0.0	0.0
Informal votes		2,267			1,765		
Total valid votes		169,980			170,482		
Turnout		172,247	78.1	▼0.7			
CDU hold	Majority	2,877	1.7	▼14.8			

=== 2017 election ===
Federal election (2017): Rheingau-Taunus – Limburg
Notes:	Blue background denotes the winner of the electorate vote. Pink background denotes a candidate elected from their party list. Yellow background denotes an electorate win by a list member, or other incumbent. A ✓ or ✗ denotes status of any incumbent, win or lose respectively.						
Party	Candidate	Votes	%	±%	Party votes	%	±%
CDU	✓ Klaus-Peter Willsch	71,555	41.8	▼10.4	59,346	34.6	▼10.9
SPD	Martin Rabanus	43,427	25.3	▼3.8	35,604	20.7	▼4.4
AfD	Christine Anderson	17,439	10.2	▲5.9	20,399	11.9	▲6.0
FDP	Alexander Müller	13,053	7.6	▲5.3	22,650	13.2	▲6.9
Greens	Timo Müller	12,020	7.0	▲1.4	15,273	8.9	▲0.3
Left	Benno Pörtner	9,394	5.5	▲1.6	11,069	6.4	▲1.9
Tierschutzpartei					1,827	1.1	
FW	Georg Horz	4,450	2.6		1,794	1.0	▲0.3
PARTEI					1,447	0.8	▲0.5
Pirates					556	0.3	▼1.5
NPD					443	0.3	▼0.7
BGE					318	0.2	
V-Partei³					294	0.2	
DM					265	0.2	
ÖDP					238	0.1	
MLPD					40	0.0	0.0
DKP					32	0.0	
BüSo					30	0.0	0.0
Informal votes		2,289			2,002		
Total valid votes		171,338			171,625		
Turnout		173,627	78.8	▲3.7			
CDU hold	Majority	28,128	16.5	▼6.5			

=== 2013 election ===
Federal election (2013): Rheingau-Taunus – Limburg
Notes:	Blue background denotes the winner of the electorate vote. Pink background denotes a candidate elected from their party list. Yellow background denotes an electorate win by a list member, or other incumbent. A ✓ or ✗ denotes status of any incumbent, win or lose respectively.						
Party	Candidate	Votes	%	±%	Party votes	%	±%
CDU	✓ Klaus-Peter Willsch	84,489	52.1	▲6.0	73,599	45.5	▲8.2
SPD	Martin Rabanus	47,152	29.1	▲1.4	40,718	25.1	▲2.9
Greens	Cornelius Dehm	9,119	5.6	▼2.4	13,955	8.6	▼1.9
AfD	Claus Manfred Winhard	6,913	4.3		9,469	5.8	
Left	Benno Pörtner	6,300	3.9	▼1.7	7,290	4.5	▼2.1
FDP	Alexander Müller	3,726	2.3	▼8.4	10,139	6.3	▼12.4
Pirates	Axel Schwenk	2,869	1.8		2,884	1.8	▼0.2
NPD	Lukas Keiner	1,464	0.9	0.0	1,476	0.9	0.0
FW					1,126	0.7	
PARTEI					611	0.4	
REP					302	0.2	▼0.5
PRO					189	0.1	
SGP					67	0.0	
BüSo					57	0.0	▼0.1
MLPD					42	0.0	0.0
Informal votes		3,756			3,864		
Total valid votes		162,032			161,924		
Turnout		165,788	75.1	▼0.1			
CDU hold	Majority	37,337	23.0	▲4.6			

=== 2009 election ===
Federal election (2009): Rheingau-Taunus – Limburg
Notes:	Blue background denotes the winner of the electorate vote. Pink background denotes a candidate elected from their party list. Yellow background denotes an electorate win by a list member, or other incumbent. A ✓ or ✗ denotes status of any incumbent, win or lose respectively.						
Party	Candidate	Votes	%	±%	Party votes	%	±%
CDU	✓ Klaus-Peter Willsch	75,224	46.1	▼1.4	60,875	37.2	▼2.6
SPD	Martin Rabanus	45,127	27.7	▼8.9	36,352	22.2	▼9.6
FDP	Alexander Müller	17,463	10.7	▲5.3	30,530	18.7	▲6.1
Greens	Simon Lissner	13,141	8.1	▲2.9	17,210	10.5	▲1.7
Left	Adolf Knapp	9,066	5.6	▲2.4	10,853	6.6	▲2.6
Pirates					3,199	2.0	
Tierschutzpartei					1,665	1.0	▲0.3
REP	Klaus Opitz	1,603	1.0	▲0.1	1,133	0.7	▲0.1
NPD	Daniela Vrankaj	1,432	0.9	▼0.4	1,490	0.9	▼0.1
BüSo					174	0.1	0.0
DVU					106	0.1	
MLPD					32	0.0	0.0
Informal votes		3,400			2,837		
Total valid votes		163,056			163,619		
Turnout		166,456	75.2	▼4.4			
CDU hold	Majority	30,097	18.4	▲7.4			

=== 2005 election ===
Federal election (2005):Rheingau-Taunus – Limburg
Notes:	Blue background denotes the winner of the electorate vote. Pink background denotes a candidate elected from their party list. Yellow background denotes an electorate win by a list member, or other incumbent. A ✓ or ✗ denotes status of any incumbent, win or lose respectively.						
Party	Candidate	Votes	%	±%	Party votes	%	±%
CDU	✓ Klaus-Peter Willsch	81,513	47.5	▲0.1	68,569	39.8	▼3.2
SPD	Martin Rabanus	62,690	36.5	▼3.8	54,870	31.9	▼3.6
FDP	Michael Denzin	9,347	5.4	▼0.3	21,553	12.5	▲4.0
Greens	Norbert Wolter	8,924	5.2	▼0.3	15,110	8.8	▼0.7
Left	Achim Ritter	5,502	3.2	▲2.2	7,013	4.1	▲3.1
NPD	Thorsten März	2,256	1.3		1,737	1.0	▲0.7
Independent	Erich Paus	1,383	0.8				
Tierschutzpartei					1,319	0.8	▲0.3
REP					1,060	0.6	▼0.1
GRAUEN					661	0.4	▲0.2
BüSo					167	0.1	▲0.1
SGP					160	0.1	
MLPD					45	0.0	
Informal votes		4,154			3,505		
Total valid votes		171,615			172,264		
Turnout		175,769	79.7	▼1.3			
CDU hold	Majority	18,823	11.0				
