= Luhrmann =

Lührmann (pronounced [ˈlyːɐ̯man]), usually anglicized as Luhrmann, is a German surname most common in Lower Saxony. Notable people with the surname include:

- Anna Lührmann (born 1983), German politician
- Baz Luhrmann (born 1962), Australian writer, director and producer
- Tanya Marie Luhrmann (born 1959), American psychological anthropologist
