= Alexander Müller (politician) =

German politician (born 1969)

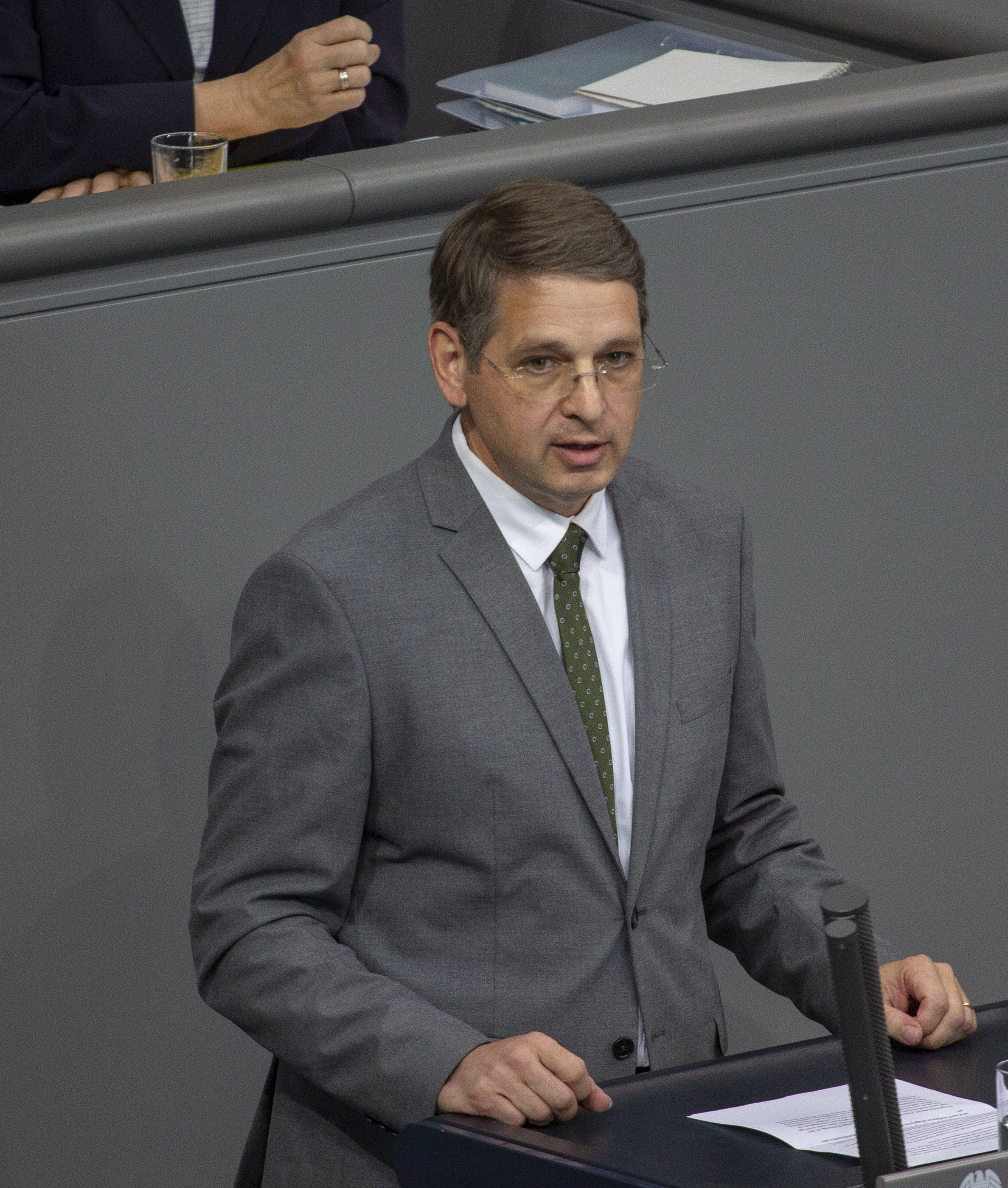

Member of the Bundestag for Hesse
- In office 24 September 2017 – 2025
- Constituency: Rheingau-Taunus – Limburg (elected via party list)

Personal details
- Born: 17 July 1969 (age 56) Bendorf, West Germany
- Citizenship: German

Alexander Müller (born 17 July 1969) is a German politician of the Free Democratic Party (FDP) who served as a member of the Bundestag from 2017 to 2025.

== Early life and education ==
Müller graduated 1988 from the Bischöfliche Gymnasium in Koblenz and studied Informatics engineering.

== Political career ==
Müller joined the Young Liberals and the FDP in 1990. He has been described as libertarian.

In 2017 Müller became a Member of the German parliament (Bundestag). From the 2021 elections, he served as his parliamentary group's spokesperson for military procurement.

In addition to his committee assignments, Müller served as deputy chair of the German-Polish Parliamentary Friendship Group from 2018 to 2021.
