= Klaus-Peter Willsch =

German politician (born 1961)

Klaus-Peter Willsch MdB
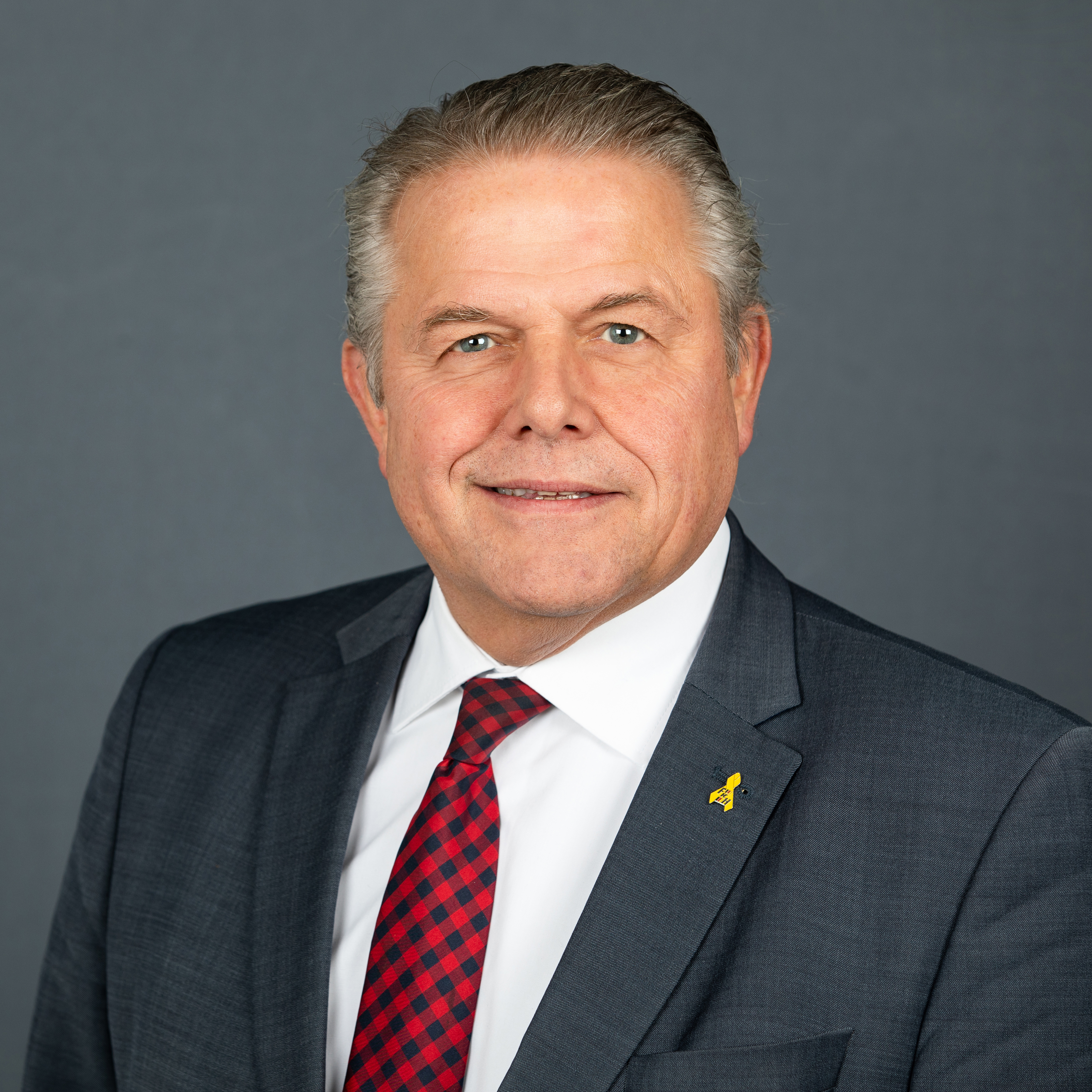
- Willsch in 2020

Member of the Bundestag; for Rheingau-Taunus – Limburg
- Incumbent
- Assumed office 26 October 1998
- Preceded by: Michael Jung

Personal details
- Born: 28 February 1961 (age 65) Bad Schwalbach, West Germany
- Party: Christian Democratic Union (since 1979)
- Children: 5
- Education: University of Mainz

Klaus-Peter Willsch (born 28 February 1961) is a German politician of the CDU and member of the Bundestag, representing Rheingau-Taunus – Limburg since 1998.

== Early life and education ==
From 1980 until 1986, Willsch attended the University of Mainz and received a master's degree in Economics and Political science. The following year, he completed his mandatory military service and left service as an Oberstleutnant of the reserve.

Following his military service, he worked at Flughafen Frankfurt/Main AG (now Fraport) until 1994.

== Political career ==
Willsch joined the CDU in 1979. In November 1993, he was elected mayor of Schlangenbad, staying in the position until joining the Bundestag four years later. Ever since joining politics, Willsch has been active in the CDU of Hesse and in his home district.

Since the 1998 elections he has been a member of the Bundestag. In parliament, he first served on the Finance Committee from 1998 until 2002. Following that, he was a member of the Budget Committee between until 2013. Since 2014, he has been serving on the Committee on Economic Affairs and Energy. In this capacity, he is his parliamentary group's rapporteur on aviation and arms exports.

In addition to his committee assignments, Willsch chaired the German-Croatian Parliamentary Friendship Group between 2006 and 2010; he has been serving as deputy chairman ever since. Since 2014, he has been chairing the Berlin-Taipei Parliamentary Circle of Friends.

From 1985 to 2011 and again since 2016, he is a member of the Kreistag of the Rheingau-Taunus-Kreis, an honorary governing body of the district. Until 2021, he was the chairman of the council.

In February 2019, the Fu Jen Catholic University of Taipei awarded him an honorary doctorate.

== Other activities ==
=== Corporate boards ===
- go4copy.net eG, Member of the Supervisory Board

=== Non-profit organizations ===
- Association of German Foundations, Member of the Parliamentary Advisory Board
- Fraunhofer Institute for Production Systems and Design Technology (IPK), Member of the Board of Trustees (since 2012)
- Vietnamese-German University (VGU), Member of the Board of Trustees (since 2011)
- Berlin Social Science Center (WZB), Member of the Board of Trustees (since 2006)
- Fraunhofer Society, Member of the Senate (2005–2010)

== Political positions ==
Within his party, Willsch is widely regarded a critic of chairwoman and Chancellor Angela Merkel. On 17 July 2015 he voted against the government's proposal to negotiate a third bailout for Greece. In June 2017, he voted against Germany's introduction of same-sex marriage. On 16 March 2018, he was one of three CDU members who broke ranks with their parliamentary group in not voting against a motion of the Alternative for Germany; instead they decided to abstain from the vote.

Ahead of the Christian Democrats’ leadership election in 2018, Willsch publicly endorsed Friedrich Merz to succeed Angela Merkel as the party's chair. In early 2020, he co-founded an informal cross-party group of MPs from the CDU, CSU and FDP parties who opposed a potential coalition government between CDU/CSU and the Green Party.

On 10 May 2025, he gave an interview to the BBC Radio 4 Today Programme in which he stated that "Ukraine is fighting our war" against Russia.

== Personal life ==
Willsch is married and has five children. The family resides in Holzhausen (which is called Holdesse in the local dialect), a town in Rheingau-Taunus-Kreis.

On 28 February 2021, on his 60th birthday, while the country was under COVID-19 restrictions, Willsch celebrated among his family, when, according to him, friends showed up "unannounced". This raised the number of people present at the home to at least twelve. While technically this was not in violation of the country's measures against the pandemic, he acknowledged that he did not "fulfill [his] role model function". The then-leader of the Hesse wing of the Social Democratic Party has called Willsch's actions "brazen and instinctless". A video of the event was published by Der Spiegel.
