= Seva Gunitsky =

American and Canadian political scientist

Seva Gunitsky (born Vsevolod Gunitskiy) is an American and Canadian political scientist.

== Life and work ==
Born in Leningrad, Soviet Union, he migrated to the United States at the age of 10, right around the time of the 1991 August Putsch. Today he is an US citizen and Canadian permanent resident. After his B.A. in 2002 at the University of Michigan, in Political Science and Economics he got his M.A. in Political Science at the Columbia University in 2006, New York, NY and Ph.D. in Political Science in 2011. Since 2011 he is at the Department of Political Science, University of Toronto – as Assistant Professor (2011-2017), Associate Professor (since 2017), Faculty Affiliate at the Schwartz Reisman Institute for Technology and Society (since 2025) and George Ignatieff Chair of Peace and Conflict Studies (since 2025).

He was also Fung Global Fellow at the Princeton Institute for International and Regional Studies (2014–15).

At the University of Toronto, he focuses his research on the ways global forces and international politics affect democracy and domestic politics.

He is the author of Aftershocks: Great Powers and Domestic Reforms in the Twentieth Century, which examines how shocks in the international system affect regime types. The book was selected by Foreign Affairs magazine as one of the best books of 2017.

Gunitsky is a frequent commentator on Russian politics and foreign policy. He publishes commentary and analysis in The Washington Post, Foreign Affairs, The New Republic and other – The New York Times, The Washington Post, USA Today, Vox.com, Bloomberg, Maclean's, CBC News, Toronto Globe and Mail, Vice, Toronto Star, The National Post. Television: CBC News, The Agenda with Steve Paikin, CTV News, Sun News.

== Trivia ==
On CBC he spoke about having to relearn Russian after immigration, a common problem for Russophone immigrant children.

== Publications ==
=== Book ===
- Seva Gunitsky: Aftershocks: Great Powers and Domestic Reforms in the Twentieth Century, Series: Princeton Studies in International History and Politics, Princeton University Press, 2017

=== Articles ===
- on Measuring democracy (see also Problems and challenges of measuring democracy, seeking for ways out there)
  - How do you measure ‘democracy’? The Monkey Cage, Washington Post, June 24, 2015.
  - Lost in the Grey Zone: Competing Measures of Democracy in the Former Soviet Republics. In Ranking the World: Grading States as a Tool of Global Governance, edited by Alexander Cooley and Jack Snyder. Cambridge University Press, 2015
- with Semuhi Sinanoglu: The Personalist Global Order, Foreign Affairs, January 26. 2026.
- A Long History of Betrayal: Why Washington keeps encouraging foreign uprisings—and then walking away. Foreign Policy, January 16. 2026.
- with Semuhi Sinanoglu, Sahib Jafarov: Prosecuting the Powerful: Historical data shows putting leaders on trial is a healthy democratic practice. Foreign Policy, October 28. 2025.
- with Kyungwon Suh, Ryan D. Griffiths: Hegemonic Shocks and Patterns of Secession. International Interactions 51(4):568-597 (October 2025)
- with Ryan D. Griffiths: The New Price of Statehood. Foreign Affairs, May 20, 2025. PDF
- with Anna Lysenko: The Invisible Front: Ukraine's IT Army and the Evolution of Cyber Resistance. Post-Soviet Affairs 41(4):263-288 (November 2025) PDF
- The Forgotten Dystopian Vision That Explains Trump's Canada Obsession. The New Republic, March 31, 2025.
- A Country Illegible Even to Itself. (Review of The Future Is History by Masha Gessen.) Inroads 44. Dec 2018. PDF
- with Andrei Tsygankov: The Wilsonian Bias in the Study of US Foreign Policy. Problems of Post-Communism 65.6:385-393. Dec 2018 PDF
- Democratic Waves in Historical Perspective. Perspectives on Politics 16.3:634-651. Sep 2018 PDF
- Democracy's Future: Riding the Hegemonic Wave. The Washington Quarterly 41.2:115-135. July 2018. PDF
- One Word to Improve US Russia Policy. The New Republic, April 27, 2018.
- The False Dawn of International Law. (Review of The Internationalists by Oona Hathaway and Scott Shapiro). War on the Rocks, January 15, 2018.
- Defining the State: It's a Family Affair. In Comparing International Systems in World History, ISQ Online Symposium, November 28, 2017
- The Lost Leviathan. (Review of The H-Word by Perry Anderson). The American Interest, August 24, 2017. PDF
- These are the three reasons fascism spread in 1930s America – and might spread again today. The Monkey Cage, Washington Post, August 12, 2017.
- Trump and the Russian Money Trail. Duck of Minerva, July 14, 2017.
- What Monday's subway bombings mean for Putin's Russia. The Monkey Cage, Washington Post, April 6, 2017
- How to unfreeze Canada's strategy in Ukraine. The Globe and Mail, March 20, 2017.
- with Tanisha Fazal: How Norms Die. Political Violence @ A Glance, March 13, 2017.
- Social media helps dictators, not just protestors. The Monkey Cage, Washington Post, March 30, 2015.
- Corrupting the Cyber-Commons: Social Media as a Tool of Autocratic Resilience. Perspectives on Politics 13.1:42-54. March 2015 PDF
- From Shocks to Waves: Hegemonic Transitions and Democratization in the Twentieth Century. International Organization 68.3:561-97. July 2014 PDF
- Complexity and Theories of Change in International Politics. International Theory 5.1:35-63. March 2013. PDF
- Review of How Enemies Become Friends: The Sources of Stable Peace by Charles A. Kupchan, H-Diplo/ISSF Roundtable 4.4, October 25, 2012.
- An Arab Spring in Moscow? The Monkey Cage, Washington Post, June 13, 2012
- Security Dilemma. In The Encyclopedia of Power, ed. by Keith Dowding. Thousand Oaks, CA: Sage Press, 2011.
- Review of The Right to Rule: How States Win and Lose Legitimacy by Bruce Gilley. Political Science Quarterly 125.1, Spring 2010, p. 163-5.878-9.
- On Thin Ice: Water Rights and Resource Disputes in the Arctic Ocean. Journal of International Affairs 61.2, Spring 2008, p. 261-271.
- Review of Insurance Against Poverty by Stefan Dercon, ed., Journal of International Affairs 59.2, Spring 2006, p. 347-50.
- From Guns to Briefcases: The Evolution of Russian Organized Crime. World Policy Journal 21.1, Spring 2004, p. 68-74.
- The Lessons of Chechnya in Iraq: A Realist Approach to Civilian Warfare. The National Interest, November 19, 2003.
