= Josef Arndgen =

German politician (1894–1966)

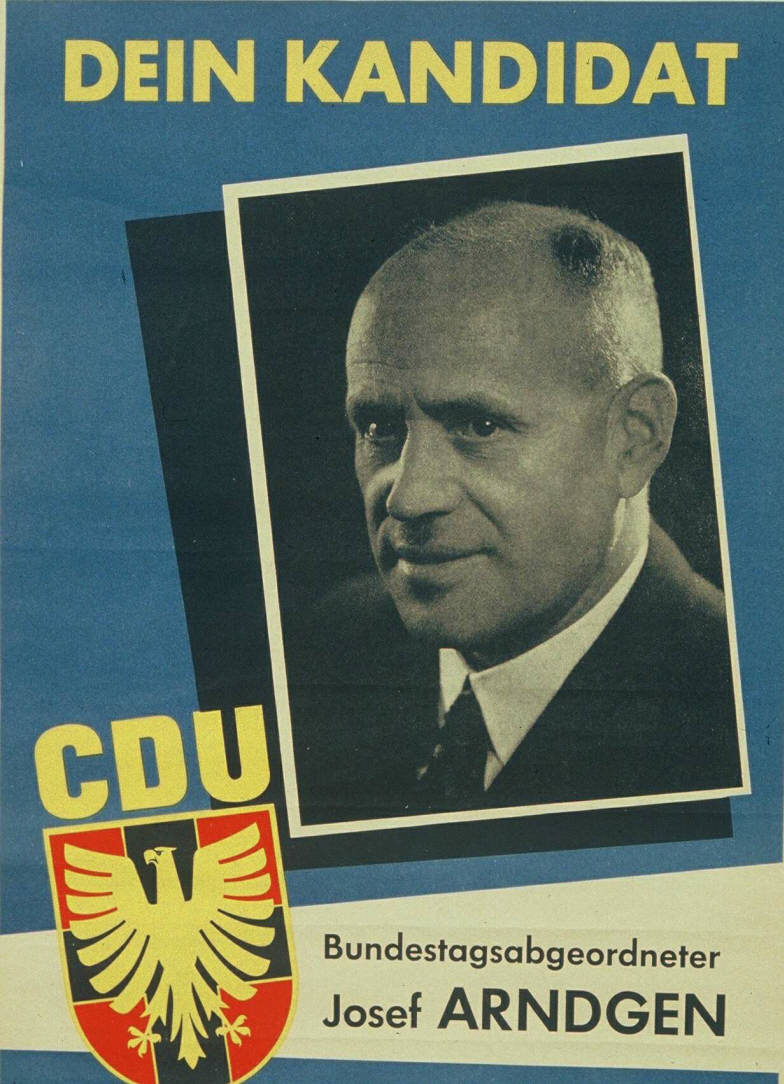
- Candidate poster of Josef Arndgens for the 1953 federal elections

Member of the Bundestag; for Limburg
- In office 7 September 1949 – 19 October 1965
- Preceded by: Constituency established
- Succeeded by: Benno Erhard

Minister for Labour and Welfare of Hesse
- In office 20 December 1946 – 9 November 1949
- Minister-President: Christian Stock
- Preceded by: Oskar Müller
- Succeeded by: Albert Wagner

Member of the Landtag of Hesse
- In office 1 December 1946 – 30 June 1949
- Preceded by: Multi-member district
- Succeeded by: Karl Josef Schlitt
- Constituency: State list

Personal details
- Born: 24 February 1894 Rheydt, Germany
- Died: 20 September 1966 (aged 72) Wiesbaden, West Germany
- Party: Christian Democratic Union
- Other political affiliations: Centre Party (1931–1933)

Josef Arndgen (24 February 1894 – 20 September 1966) was a German politician of the Christian Democratic Union (CDU) and former member of the German Bundestag.

== Political career ==
In 1931 Arndgen joined the Centre Party, of which he was a member until its dissolution in 1933. After the Second World War he participated in the founding of the CDU in Frankfurt am Main. From 1946 to 1949 Arndgen was a member of the state parliament in Hesse.

Since the first federal elections in 1949, Arndgen was a member of the German Bundestag as a directly elected member of the Limburg constituency until 1965. He was vice-chairman of the Bundestag committees for social policy (1949–1957) and for questions of war victims and prisoners of war (1949–1953). From 1957 to 13 November 1958 he was Chairman of the Bundestag Committee on Labour. From 28 October 1958 to 1965, Arndgen was Deputy Chairman of the CDU/CSU parliamentary group in the Bundestag.

From 7 January 1947 to 9 November 1949 Arndgen was Minister of Labour and Welfare in Hesse.

== Literature ==
Herbst, Ludolf; Jahn, Bruno (2002). Vierhaus, Rudolf (ed.). Biographisches Handbuch der Mitglieder des Deutschen Bundestages. 1949–2002 [Biographical Handbook of the Members of the German Bundestag. 1949–2002] (in German). München: De Gruyter - De Gruyter Saur. p. 1715. ISBN 978-3-11-184511-1.
