= Martin Rabanus =

German politician (born 1971)

Member of the Bundestag
- Incumbent
- Assumed office 2024
- In office 2013–2021

Personal details
- Born: 22 September 1971 (age 55) Fulda, West Germany (now Germany)
- Party: SPD
- Education: Goethe University Frankfurt

Martin Rabanus (born 22 September 1971) is a German politician of the Social Democratic Party (SPD) who has served as a member of the Bundestag from the state of Hesse from 2013 to 2021 and again since 2024.

== Political career ==
Rabanus first became a member of the Bundestag in the 2013 German federal election. He was a member of the Committee for Education, Research and Technology Assessment from 2014 until 2019 before moving to the Committee for Culture and Media.

In addition to his committee assignments, Rabanus chaired the German Parliamentary Friendship Group for Relations with the Southern African States since 2016.

In the negotiations to form the fourth coalition government under the leadership of Chancellor Angela Merkel following the 2017 federal elections, Rabanus was part of the working group on cultural affairs and media, led by Monika Grütters, Dorothee Bär and Michael Roth. In the negotiations to form a Grand Coalition under the leadership of Friedrich Merz's Christian Democrats (CDU together with the Bavarian CSU) and the SPD following the 2025 German elections, he was again part of the SPD delegation in the working group on cultural affairs and media, this time led by Christiane Schenderlein, Volker Ullrich and Carsten Brosda.

== Other activities ==
- German Adult Education Association (DVV), Chairman of the Board (since 2019)
- Deutsche Welle, Member of the Supervisory Board (since 2018)
- Federal Agency for Civic Education (BPB), Member of the Board of Trustees (since 2018)
- German Federal Film Board (FFA), Member of the Supervisory Board (since 2018)
- Haus der Geschichte, Member of the Board of Trustees (since 2018)
- German Foundation for World Population (DSW), Member of the Parliamentary Advisory Board (–2021)
