= Autocratic legalism =

Weaponization of legal systems

Autocratic legalism is a form of weaponized legalism and politicization of the law. Political scientist Javier Corrales first defined the term in the context of democratic backsliding in the 21st century. It was later expanded upon by sociologist Kim Lane Scheppele. The term describes the use of legal methods that are used by autocrats to weaken the checks and balances in liberal constitutional democracies, effectively transforming them from democratic systems into autocracies and hybrid regimes.

== Background ==
Before the end of the Cold War, the most common form of democratic backsliding occurred through the use of election fraud or the military coup d'état. From 1950 to 2016 there were 475 coup attempts, with the height of this era occurring in 1966, with a total of 19 attempted coups, with 12 succeeding in overthrows. Since the 1990s, this pattern has changed. The most studied cases of democratic backsliding include Venezuela, Hungary, Turkey, Russia, and more recently, the United States.

Autocratic legalism describes how modern democratic governance faces its greatest threat, not from populism or from overt state violence, but from the law itself. Legally elected heads of state use the law to limit and restrict liberalism. This in turn weakens checks and balances, consolidates power, and centralizes decision-making in the executive branch, eventually transforming liberal democracies into electoral autocracies while maintaining the appearance and facade of a functioning democracy.

== Definition and terms ==
Political scientist Javier Corrales defined the idea of autocratic legalism in 2015. Corrales applied it to the modern context of democratic backsliding in the 21st century, defining it as "the use, abuse, and non-use of the law in service of the executive branch."

=== Use, abuse, and non-use of the law ===
In his work, Corrales applied these three core principles to Venezuela's slide towards authoritarianism under Hugo Chávez. For example, Corrales shows how the use of the law was made possible with complete control over the legislature and the Supreme Court. This control allowed the ruling party to make use of at least ten autocratic laws with which to favor the executive branch and weaken the opposition.

In this series, the use of the law is followed by the abuse of the law, with Corrales defining the abuse as "the inconsistent and biased implementation of laws and regulations." One example of this abuse is illustrated by media bias, which favors the ruling party. To obtain this result, the government sought to prevent independent media from publishing criticism. They were able to achieve this goal by funding pro-government sources, such as state-sponsored newspapers and television, often by withholding government funds for things like advertisements, but also by threatening media outlets in other ways, such as through the loss of broadcasting licenses or fines. This policy led to the elimination of many privately owned media outlets. Private media companies that remained engaged in self-censorship or refused to cover politics.

Law exists but is arbitrarily enforced. Courts have been captured by the ruling party and complaints about election irregularities are ignored by the Supreme Court.

"Corrales identified autocratic legalism...to describe what Chávez did to consolidate political power and sideline competitors," writes sociologist Kim Lane Scheppele. "Chávez used the law by pushing the parliament to pass new laws giving him new powers, abused the law by deliberately changing the interpretation of law on the books to suit his goals, and non-used the law by failing to enforce law that stood in his way."

=== Creation of new laws ===
Scheppele broadened the definition in 2018, using autocratic legalism to describe the same methods as Corrales but "emphasizing the deliberate creation of new law as a way of consolidating political power...When electoral mandates plus constitutional and legal change are used in the service of an illiberal agenda..." Scheppele also coined the term "Frankenstate" to describe the creation of new laws in countries that use separate pieces of constitutional provisions, often taken from liberal democracies, but put together in their home countries to produce an amalgamation that undermines democracy and centralizes power for the ruling party. In this way, autocratic legalism allows leaders to use the law to undermine liberal democracy while appearing to uphold it.

=== Other terms ===
Other terms that describe similar legal approaches include abusive constitutionalism, constitutional authoritarianism, constitutional retrogression, and autocratization. Hungarian legal scholar András Sajó used the phrase "ruling by cheating." Sajó writes, "The constitutional regime of illiberal democracy is a regime of cheating...it calls itself a constitutional system of checks and balances, wherein reality separation of powers serves only one-man rule."

== Legal methods ==
Legalistic autocrats, according to Scheppele, follow a basic playbook to come to power through elections and then slowly use legal methods to eliminate liberal democracy from their respective governments, often by targeting the opposition, controlling the media, going after critics, and changing election laws. These autocrats rely on teams of lawyers, not tanks nor soldiers, to take over and rewrite their constitutions and dismantle democratic and liberal constitutionalism. These autocrats give the outward appearance of supporting democracy while in reality behaving like dictators. For Scheppele, the transition from a democracy to an autocracy is complete when the rotation of power from one party to another and from one leader to the next is dismantled.

The basic method shares this sequence of incremental steps along the path to autocracy:

1. Win elections that are free and fair
2. Capture the parliament or legislature
3. Capture the courts
4. Remove civil service protection to permit substitution of loyalists
5. Systematically dismantle checks on executive power
6. Fill independent positions with loyalists
7. Harness the media as an echo chamber
8. Defund and threaten the civil and political opposition
9. Encourage private violence for people who criticize the government
10. Rewrite the election laws; never leave office.

== The PAL Project ==
In 2019, Scheppele gave an address to the Law and Society Association (LSA) that led to the creation of the Project of Autocratic Legalism (The PAL Project) by other members. After its formation, the PAL Project began studying the use of autocratic legalism in the Global North and Global South. According to professor of international studies Fabio de Sa e Silva, the evidence shows that "autocrats use law to consolidate power and sideline opponents, but they build on opportunities that are unique to each context."

PAL research topics include:

- Academia: attacks on academic freedom and the university; policing and resistance
- Brazil: manipulation of the Freedom of Information Act as a strategy for authoritarianism; use of transparency and secrecy norms to hide bad actors without legal change; authoritarianism and state violence under Bolsonaro
- Egypt: a judiciary restricted to the elite and upper class; lack of independence, undermining of constitutional rights
- Europe: genocide denial and free speech in the European Court of Human Rights
- India: violence and discrimination against minority groups
- International law: neoliberal facilitation of transnational oligarchy and authoritarianism
- Turkey: political trials to neutralize threats and restructure society; use of legal community, experts, and media to promote authoritarianism and weaken democracy; incremental autocratic legalism, from securitization to autocratization
- United States: Donald Trump's pursuit of power, abuse of power, and attack on expertise; challenges to free expression at the level of the state judicial system
- Venezuela: under the rule by law of Nicolás Maduro.
