= Inroads =

Inroads may refer to:

- Inroads (organization), an American organization that offers internships
- Inroads (album), a 1986 album by Béla Fleck
