= Democracy in Afghanistan =

Democracy in Afghanistan has been severely limited and characterized by short, unstable historical periods since the formation of the contemporary state of Afghanistan in the 20th century. Following the rise of power of Ghazi Amanullah Khan in 1919, the first elements of a democratic government in the country began to emerge, with the formation of a constitution and increased civil liberties. Amanullah's political reforms resulted in his overthrow and for much of the rest of the 20th century, until 1964, there was limited democratization in the country. With the establishment of a bicameral national legislature in 1964 by King Zahir Shah, political parties began to form; however, none of these reforms were lasting after Zahir Shah's removal from power in 1973 and the formation of an autocratic Afghanistan republic.

The country experienced increasingly severe democratic backsliding from 1973 onwards, eventually falling under the undemocratic, religiously conservative Taliban rule in 1996. Democracy was reintroduced following the U.S.-led invasion of Afghanistan in 2001, where an Islamic Republic with a president and relatively liberal constitution was reinstated.

== History ==
=== Kingdom of Afghanistan (1919-1973) ===
The first elements of a democratic government in the country began to emerge under the leadership of Ghazi Amanullah Khan, who ruled first as the Emir of the Emirate of Afghanistan and later as the first King of the Kingdom of Afghanistan. Amanullah instituted a number of political reforms modeled on the Western democratic model, including drafting the country's first constitution the "Statute of the Supreme Government of Afghanistan," which was approved and ratified by 872 tribal elders and government officials gathered in a Loya Jirga in Jalalabad on 11 April 1922. Amongst various liberal changes to Afghan's governance, one of the most notable elements that the constitution contained was article 16, which entitled all Afghan citizens equal rights and freedoms. Due to his significant popularity amongst the Afghan populace, and in line with his Western-outlook, Amanullah also implemented cultural reforms which eased restrictions on a number of civil liberties, particularly with regards to women's rights.

Under Amanullah's rule, new coeducational schools were formed in many regions and the strict Sharia-based dress codes for women that had existed for centuries were overturned. As a result of these social reforms, conservative Islamists in the country staged a revolt, leading to overthrow of Amanullah's government and the imposition of rule by Habibullāh Kalakāni, leader of the "Saqqawists" opposition movement in early 1929. Kalakani's rule lasted only nine months before he was replaced by exiled general Nadir Khan on 13 October 1929. After his rise to power, Nadir abandoned most of Amanullah's reforms, although his son and successor king Mohammad Zahir Shah made a more gradual program of reform. It wasn't until 1964 that major democratic reforms would be reinstituted, with King Zahir Shah promulgating a new liberal constitution creating a bicameral national legislature.

=== Republic of Afghanistan (1973-1989) ===
On July 17, 1973, amidst increasing discontent with King Zahir Shah's government, former Prime Minister Mohammad Sardar Daoud Khan seized power in a non-violent coup and abolished the monarchy, establishing the first Republic of Afghanistan. Under Daoud, the 1964 constitution was abrogated and he consolidated power to himself, declaring himself both president and prime minister. The political assassination of prominent communist and member of the People's Democratic Party of Afghanistan (PDPA) Mir Akbar Khyber by the government in 1978 by the government sparked fears amongst the communist opposition of Daoud's intentions. As a result, on 28 April 1978, the PDPA overthrew Daoud's government in the Saur Revolution. Renamed the Democratic Republic of Afghanistan (DRA), the new government, while granting increased civil rights, became extremely repressive and thousands were killed or imprisoned as most regions across the country began to revolt against the new government.

=== First Taliban Emirate (1989-2001) ===
Following nearly a decade of civil war from 1989 to 1996 and the withdrawal of Soviet forces on 15 February 1989, much of the country became consolidated under the rule of the religiously conservative and traditionalist Taliban militant group. Seeking to implement their strict interpretation of Sharia law, civil rights were severely constricted and much of the country experienced significant democratic backsliding. The antidemocratic Taliban regime fought against the liberal democratic state of the Northern Alliance under military leader Ahmad Shah Massoud for much of its existence in the late 1990s as Massoud sought to end the Taliban's repressive policies and bring back elements of democracy into the country.

=== Islamic Republic of Afghanistan (2001-2021) ===
After the September 11th attacks in the United States in 2001, a coalition of Western powers invaded Afghanistan, supporting the Northern Alliance and toppling the Taliban by the end of the year. With the ouster of Taliban forces, the U.S.-centered coalition set up a provisional government under the presidency of Hamid Karzai on an interim basis for a period of six months. Karzai was rechosen as leader in the 2002 emergency loya jirga (lit. "grand assembly")—a traditional election held amongst tribal leaders and Afghan political figures—for a two-year term beginning that year. Under the Karzai administration, Afghanistan held a nationwide election with international, independent observers in 2004, where he was elected officially into government as the Islamic State of Afghanistan was established. He would later be reelected in 2009.

== Current status ==
The Islamic Republic of Afghanistan was overthrown by the Taliban in 2021 and modern-day Afghanistan has again experienced democratic backsliding under the leadership of the Taliban. Afghanistan was in 2023 the 4th least electoral democratic country in the world according to V-Dem Democracy indices.

== Analysis ==
Prior to the 2021 overthrow of the government by the Taliban, Afghanistan had been consistently ranked as a below-average democracy by U.S.-based non-governmental organization Freedom House. According to their yearly survey Freedom in the World, Afghanistan scored only 27 points in 2019 to 2021 on a 100-point scale, falling in the category of "not free countries." One major reason cited amongst scholars for the weakness of Afghanistan's democracy is the rampant corruption in the country: in a study by Transparency International, Afghanistan remained one of the most corrupt countries in the world. In 2010, a report published by the United Nations Office on Drugs and Crime indicated that bribery consumed approximately 23% of the GDP of Afghanistan. This corruption was present in the highest levels of government, with the New Kabul Bank scandal in which a small number of political elites, including cabinet ministers, had embezzled nearly $1 billion through fraudulent loan schemes.

Another limitation of the republic was its poor electoral conduct. While the first presidential election of the republic in 2004 was relatively peaceful, the following 2009 presidential election was hampered by significant flaws, including a lack of security, low voter turnout, and widespread electoral fraud. The 2014 presidential election saw similar issues, with leading candidate Abdullah Abdullah narrowly surviving an assassination attempt on 6 June 2014. Fraud was alleged to be widespread in the election, leading the E.U. to send six observers to Kabul, Balkh and Herat provinces. In a recording of Ziaul Haq Amarkhel, the secretary of Afghanistan's Independent Election Commission, he told officials to "take sheep to the mountains, stuff them, and bring them back," in a reference to ballot stuffing. This was one among approximately 5,000 intercepted communications that suggested electoral fraud. American journalist Steve Coll reported that "Ghani's surge of votes in the second round from Pashtun areas racked by violence was inherently suspect. Some analysts guessed that if all the fraud could be identified accurately, Abdullah would have won the election, but not every international analyst agreed."

The following and final presidential election held by the republic in 2019 became the most contentious: according to then-preliminary results, incumbent Ashraf Ghani was re-elected with 923,592 votes, 50.64% of the vote, against runner-up Abdullah Abdullah. With a voter turnout less than 20% and allegations of fraud, Abdullah Abdullah rejected the results and took steps to create his own parallel government and separate inauguration, starting a major political crisis in the country. This political crisis would not be resolved until May 2020, when Ghani and Abdullah agreed on a power-sharing deal in which Ghani would continue to lead the country as president while Abdullah would be responsible for the peace talks with the Taliban.

== See also ==
- Politics of Afghanistan
- Elections in Afghanistan
