= The Third Wave: Democratization in the Late Twentieth Century =

1991 book by Samuel P. Huntington

- Cover of the first edition
- Author: Samuel P. Huntington
- Language: English
- Subject: Third Wave Democracy
- Publisher: University of Oklahoma Press
- Publication date: 1991
- Publication place: United States
- Media type: Hardcover, paperback
- ISBN: 0-8061-2516-0

The Third Wave: Democratization in the Late Twentieth Century is a 1991 book by Samuel P. Huntington which outlines the significance of a third wave of democratization to describe the global trend that has seen more than 60 countries throughout Europe, Latin America, Asia, and Africa undergo some form of democratic transitions since Portugal's "Carnation Revolution" in 1974.

The catch-phrase "the third wave" has been widely used among scholars studying what is considered by some to be democratic transitions and democratization throughout much of the developing world. The phrase however, has come under criticism, largely by those who stress that so called democratic transitions are little more than transitions to semi-authoritarian rule, as demanded by the international realities of a post-Cold War world.

== Transition ==
In the text, Huntington defines democracy by reference to its procedure, writing, "The central procedure of democracy is the selection of leaders through competitive elections by the people they govern."

=== Causes ===
According to Huntington, the rise of the Third Wave is derived from five main causative factors:

- Decrease of legitimacy of authoritarian regimes due to increased popular expectation of periodic and competitive election, and/or military failure. The economic crisis during the 1970s had a massive impact especially on those regimes which used economic growth for legitimisation.
- Growth in global economic output helped modernize many less developed economies. Economic modernization, which includes structural changes like increased rates of urbanization, education, and a rising middle class, unleashes a constellation of social forces with the organizational capacity and education to press for democratic governance.
- Changes in the Catholic Church brought about by Vatican II emphasized individual rights and opposition to authoritarian rule. This shift in world view was especially important for the Catholic countries of Southern Europe and Latin America, as well as the Philippines, Poland and Hungary.
- Regional contingency factor (Snowball effect. For Soviet equivalent see Domino Theory), also known as demonstration effects, happens when success of democracy in one country causes other countries to democratize.
- The role played by the US and the EU. President Carter renewed a critical approach toward communist countries bringing back on the table the theme of human rights; EU was an appreciated model in Europe and after 1989 required precise democratic standards to be joined. Gorbachev contributed to easing the tensions with Eastern European countries and pushing toward reforms.

International structural factors during the 1970s were cited by Huntington as the causal sources for initiating the Third-Wave. Prospects for European Union membership provided the necessary pressure for creating the critical domestic masses for the push toward democracy in Portugal, Spain, and Greece, since the establishment of democratic institutions was necessary to secure the economic benefits for Community membership. As other authors have pointed out, E.U. membership has also functioned to inspire democratic changes in a number of former Soviet satellites, including Poland, Hungary, and the Czech Republic.

Other international factors also contributed to launching the Third-Wave. First, international efforts by states and activists helped politicise issues such as human rights and democratisation at the international level. Huntington believes that the beginning of the third wave corresponds to the Helsinki Final Act of 1975, which helped secure commitments for human rights and democratic governance from Eastern European countries. While this by itself was not enough to guarantee democratisation, it did provide an easy gauge by which the Soviet Bloc was measured and criticised. Secondly, by the mid-1970s, the United States began to reformulate its foreign policy. Rather than supporting any regime that promised loyalty to the west, economic and political support was increasingly premised upon the observance of civil liberties and political rights.

In addition to the reform pressures from international actors and powerful states as a culprit to the sustenance of the third-wave, which transpired from the 1970s through to the 1990s, Huntington cites that the "demonstration effect" is an important factor for explaining the breadth of the third wave. For example, once it was clear that the reformist Solidarity in Poland would come to power, reformists in other eastern European countries gained energy to push for change. As the wave swept through Eastern Europe, African leaders began to see ’the winds of change’ and subsequently redrafted their constitutions to allow for multiparty elections, fearing that any resistance to reforms would lead to an emboldened opposition.

=== Processes ===
- Transformation – A top-down (elite-controlled) change from within government (as postulated by the theoreticians of the modernization theory some 30 years ago).
- Transplacement – Negotiated reform of regime and government.
- Replacement – Regime breakdown (rupture) and the collapse of authoritarianism.

=== Characteristics ===
- Uncertainty
- Internal factors paramount – Especially important is role of elites and the ensuing split in the regime.

== Consolidation ==
=== Problems ===
- Transitional problems (institution-building)
- Contextual problems.
- Systemic problems (performance of new regime)

Consolidation after "two-turnover test" (Huntington 1991)

=== Elites ===
Huntington believed in the importance of individual agents in the transition to democracy: "democracies are created not by causes but by causers" (Huntington 1991:107). To Huntington the transition was based on elite choice, perception, beliefs and actions, while subsequent consolidation was based on elite pacts and consensus.
