= Rotation of power =

Government structure and democratic principle

Rotation of power (also called alternation of power) is a political process in which competing political actors peacefully transfer executive and legislative control to their competitors through established legal mechanisms, typically elections.

Rotation of power is considered a hallmark of a functioning liberal democracy and a primary indicator of democratic consolidation. The concept suggests that for a system to be truly democratic, the governing party must not only be subject to elections but must also be capable of losing them and voluntarily relinquishing authority to the opposition.

== Theoretical foundations ==
In political science, the rotation of power is often used as the "litmus test" for democracy. In 1978, Juan José Linz defined democracy as a regime that necessitates not a turnover of parties in power, but as bearing the "potential" for such turnover. Adam Przeworski further refined this, defining democracy as "a system in which parties lose elections".

Some scholars have operationalized the test. In 1991, Samuel P. Huntington proposed the "two-turnover test": a democracy is considered consolidated only after the party that took power in the initial election loses a subsequent election and peacefully hands over power, and that successor likewise transfers power peacefully after a future election.

Kouroutakis 2026 argues that the rotation of power is an inherent principle of democracy that prevents "political self-entrenchment", where incumbents exploit their office to tilt the political playing field. Whereas the political science literature has largely approached alternation as a political event, Kouroutakis conceptualizes the rotation of power as a constitutional principle that distinguishes democracies from authoritarian regimes. According to this view, the "rotation of power" creates a self-enforcing equilibrium where the "losers" of an election accept the result because they believe they have a fair chance to win and return to power in the future.

== Rotation of power in law ==
In 2017, the Supreme Tribunal of Justice of Bolivia (TSJ) ruled that term limits on public offices violated the human rights of Bolivians, which allowed Evo Morales to run for a fourth term in the 2019 Bolivian general election. The TSJ cited Article 23 of the American Convention on Human Rights, which states: "Every citizen shall enjoy the following rights and opportunities: [...] to have access, under general conditions of equality, to the public service of his country." In 2021, the Inter-American Court of Human Rights (IACHR) issued a landmark advisory opinion (OC-28/21) regarding the compatibility of indefinite presidential reelection with the American Convention on Human Rights. The IACHR rejected this "human right" argument, and ruled that the rotation of power is fundamental to representative democracy, because it prevents any incumbent from achieving "disproportionate dominance" over the state and enacting authoritarianism.

== See also ==
- Peaceful transition of power
- Democratic backsliding
- Term limit
- Two-term limit
- Dominant-party system
- Opposition (politics)
