= Javier Corrales =

American political scientist

Javier Corrales (born 1966) is a political scientist at Amherst College. He was born in Puerto Rico to parents that were part of the Cuban exile. He received a BS (1986) in Foreign Service from Georgetown University and earned his PhD (1996) in political science from Harvard University. His dissertation focused on comparative economy in Argentina and Venezuela. He was a fellow at the Woodrow Wilson International Center for Scholars from 2000-2001. Since 2014, he has served as Dwight W. Morrow 1895 Professor of Political Science at Amherst. In 2015, Corrales coined the term autocratic legalism to explain how Venezuela transitioned to authoritarianism by using the legal system to impose autocracy. Sociologist Kim Lane Scheppele expanded upon the idea in her own work in 2018. Corrales is the author of the book Autocracy Rising: How Venezuela Transitioned to Authoritarianism (2022).

== Selected publications ==
- Autocracy Rising (Brookings Institution Press, 2022)
- The Politics of LGBTQ Rights Expansion in Latin America and Caribbean (Cambridge Elements, Cambridge University Press, 2022)
- Fixing Democracy (Oxford University Press, 2018)
- With Michael Penfold. Dragon in the Tropics: Venezuela and the Legacy of Hugo Chávez (Brookings Institution Press, 2015)
- With Daniel Altschuler. The Promise of Participation: Experiments in Participatory Governance in Honduras and Guatemala (Palgrave/Macmillan 2013)
- With Carlos A. Romero. U.S.-Venezuela Relations Since the 1990s (Routledge 2013).
- Co-editor with Mario Pecheny. The Politics of Sexuality in Latin America: A Reader on GLBT Rights (University of Pittsburgh Press 2010)
- Presidents Without Parties: the Politics of Economic Reform in Argentina and Venezuela in the 1990s (Penn State University Press 2002)
