= Anna Lührmann =

German politician (born 1983)

Minister of State for Europe
- In office 8 December 2021 – 2025
- Minister: Annalena Baerbock
- Preceded by: Michael Roth
- Succeeded by: Gunther Krichbaum

Member of the Bundestag for Rheingau-Taunus – Limburg
- In office 2002–2009
- Incumbent
- Assumed office 2021

Personal details
- Born: 14 June 1983 (age 43) Lich, Hesse, West Germany (now Germany)
- Party: Alliance 90/The Greens
- Education: University of Hagen; Ahfad University for Women; Humboldt University of Berlin

Anna Lührmann (born 14 June 1983) is a German political scientist and politician of Alliance 90/The Greens who has been serving as a member of the Bundestag since the 2021 German federal election.

In addition to her work in parliament, Lührmann served as Minister of State at the Federal Foreign Office in the government of Chancellor Olaf Scholz from 2021 to 2025.

Lührmann became the youngest-ever member of the Bundestag in 2002, as well as the youngest member of Parliament in the world. As an academic, she later served as the deputy director of the V-Dem Institute and assistant professor at the University of Gothenburg. She returned to politics in 2021, representing the Rheingau-Taunus – Limburg constituency in the Bundestag.

== Early life and political career ==
Born in Lich, Hesse, then part of West Germany, Lührmann first became involved in Germany's Green Party at thirteen and her election came after a fast career in the youth organisation Grün-Alternatives Jugendbündnis.

=== Member of the German Parliament, 2002–2009 ===
In Parliament, Lührmann served on the Budget Committee from 2004 until 2009. In this capacity, she was her parliamentary group's rapporteur on the annual budget of Germany of the Federal Ministry of Transport, Building and Urban Affairs, the Federal Ministry of Family Affairs, Senior Citizens, Women and Youth, and the Federal Ministry for Economic Affairs and Technology.

== Academic career ==
Lührmann began studying political sciences at University of Hagen, where she obtained her BA, followed by a MSc in Gender and Peace Studies from Ahfad University for Women (Sudan), and a MA in Research Training in Social Sciences from Humboldt University of Berlin. In 2015, she received her PhD from Humboldt University. In August 2015, she joined the V-Demo Institute at the Department of Political Science, University of Gothenburg, Sweden, as Postdoctoral Research Fellow. Lührmann's research interests include democratic resilience, autocracy, elections, regime legitimacy, and democracy aid and the United Nations.

From 2009 until 2011, Lührmann advised the UNDP in Sudan on electoral and parliamentary issues. She is lead author of UNDP's handbook Enhancing Youth Political Participation Throughout the Electoral Cycle A Good Practice Guide, which was published in 2013.

== Return to politics ==
Lührmann has been a member of the German Bundestag again since the 2021 federal election. Following the formation of the government of Olaf Scholz (Chancellor of Germany), Annalena Baerbock (Minister for Foreign Affairs) appointed her minister of state at the Federal Foreign Office. In this capacity, she represents the German government in the General Affairs Council and the Committee of Ministers of the Council of Europe.

In October 2023, Lührmann participated in the first joint cabinet retreat of the German and French governments in Hamburg, chaired by Scholz and President Emmanuel Macron.

== Other activities ==
- Jacques Delors Centre at Hertie School, Member of the Advisory Board (since 2022)
- Tarabya Cultural Academy, Ex-Officio Chair of the Advisory Board (since 2022)
- Franco-German Institute Ludwigsburg (dfi), Ex-Officio Member of the Executive Committee (since 2021)
- Center for International Peace Operations (ZIF), Ex-Officio Chair of the International Advisory Board (since 2021)
- German Institute of Global and Area Studies (GIGA), Member of the Board of Trustees
- Project Adjust, University of Kiel, Member of the Advisory Board
- German Federation for the Environment and Nature Conservation (BUND), Member
- European Partnership for Democracy (EPD), Member of the Advisory Board
- German Federal Environmental Foundation (DBU), Member of the Board of Trustees (2007–2008)
- German Foundation for World Population (DSW), Member of the Board of Trustees (2002–2005)

== Political positions ==
Lührmann belongs to the moderate wing of Germany's Green Party.

== Private life ==
Until 2023 Lührmann was married with German diplomat Rainer Eberle, with whom she had one daughter.
