= Staffan I. Lindberg =

Swedish political scientist

Staffan I. Lindberg, 2023

Staffan I. Lindberg (born 1969) is a Swedish political scientist and director of the V-Dem Institute at the University of Gothenburg. Lindberg's main research interests are comparative politics, democracy and democratization, Africa, political organizations, corruption and clientelism.

== Early life and education ==
Lindberg received his Ph.D. in 2005 from Lund University, Sweden. His dissertation "The power of elections : democratic participation, competition and legitimacy in Africa" won the American Political Science Association's Juan Linz Award for Best Article 2005.

== Career ==
Lindberg began his teaching career at Lund University, then worked as an assistant professor at Kent State University between 2005 and 2006. From 2006 until 2013 he was an assistant professor and then an associate professor in the Department of Political Science at University of Florida. He has also spent two years in Ghana as parliamentary advisor, and consults on a regular basis for donors in Africa.

Lindberg was the Program Chair for the African Studies Association in 2013. From 2006 to 2009 he was the co-PI of the international research consortium African Power and Politics program involving seven institutions across three continents with a budget of £3.5mn on behalf of the University of Florida.

Lindberg was on the executive committee of the American Political Science Association's Comparative Politics Section (2011–2013), Executive Co-Editor of APSA's Comparative Democratization Newsletter (2012–2014). For 2.5 years at University of Gothenburg, he was project coordinator of the Center for Data Analysis, integrating the data and online analysis facilities of the SOM Institute, the QoG Institute, the MOD Institute, the Swedish NES, the Mediabarometer. Lindberg was also in charge of the World Values Survey in Sweden at University of Gothenburg 2010–2012, where he has been appointed full professor in 2013. Lindberg serves as Founding Director of the V-Dem Institute since 2014 and leads several major democracy research programs. Lindberg's publications (2025) have, according to Google Scholar, over 24 000 citations and an h-index of 69.

He is a former member of the Young Academy of Sweden (2014–2019). and a member of the Standing Committee for Freedom and Responsibility in Science at the International Science Council (2022–2025).

== Distinctions ==
- (Sweden) H. M. The King's Medal 8th size on Seraphim Order ribbon (2023).
- American Political Science Association Lijphart/Przeworski/Verba Data Set Award (2016).

== Bibliography ==
- Lindberg, Staffan I.; Svensson, Richard (2012). Rösträtt till salu : det nya hotet mot demokratin? [The Right to Vote for Sale : A New Threat to Democracy?] (in Swedish). Stockholm: Atlas/Premiss. ISBN 9789186743154.
- Lindberg, Staffan I., ed. (2009). Democratization by Elections: A New Mode of Transition. Baltimore: Johns Hopkins University Press. ISBN 9780801893193.
- Lindberg, Staffan I. (2006). Democracy and Elections in Africa. Baltimore: Johns Hopkins University Press. ISBN 9780801883330.
