= V-Dem Institute =

Swedish research institute

- Other name: Varieties of Democracy Institute
- Website: v-dem.net

The V-Dem Institute (an abbreviation of Varieties of Democracy Institute), founded by Staffan I. Lindberg in 2014, is an independent research institute that serves as the headquarters of the V-Dem Project, a database that seeks to conceptualize and measure democracy. V-Dem defines "democracy" using seven key principles (electoral, liberal, participatory, deliberative, egalitarian, majoritarian, and consensual) which emphasize the concept of "rule by the people". As part of its work, it publishes a dataset known as the V-Dem Democracy Indices that is based on its key principles. The headquarters of the project is based at the department of political science, University of Gothenburg, Sweden.

== Democracy indices ==
Electoral Democracy Index

Liberal Democracy Index

The V-Dem Institute's indices over time

0.90–1.00
0.80–0.89
0.70–0.79
0.60–0.69
0.50–0.59
0.40–0.49
0.30–0.39
0.20–0.29
0.10–0.19
0.00–0.09
No data

The V-Dem Institute publishes a number of high-profile datasets that describe qualities of different governments, annually published and publicly available for free. These datasets are used by political scientists, due to information on hundreds of indicator variables describing all aspects of government, especially on the quality of democracy, inclusivity, and other economic indicators. Compared to other measures of democracy (such as the Polity data series and Freedom House's Freedom in the World), the V-Dem Institute's measures of democracy are more granular and 2020 included "more than 470 indicators, 82 mid-level indices, and 5 high-level indices covering 202 polities from the period of 1789–2019". Political scientist Daniel Hegedus describes V-Dem as "the most important provider of quantitative democracy data for scholarly research".

The V-Dem institute also republishes 59 other indicators and several other indices which are created, in part, with the assistance of V-Dem indices. The Digital Society Project is a subset of indicators on V-Dem's survey which asks questions about the political status of social media and the internet.

== Democracy Report ==
The institute evaluates states regarding democracy, having identified between 2010 and 2020 the marked states in red as having become more autocratic and in blue more democratic.

The V-Dem Institute publishes the Democracy Report that describes the state of democracy in the world, with a focus on democratization and autocratization. The Democracy Report is published annually in March. The Democracy Report, the dataset, scientific articles, and working papers are free to download on the institute's website, which also provides interactive graphic tools.

== ERT dataset ==
The Episodes of Regime Transformation (ERT) dataset identifies and collects data on episodes of democratization (liberalizing autocracy, democratic deepening) and autocratization (democratic regression, autocratic regression) within the V-Dem dataset. They conceptualize episodes of regime transformation as "periods when a country undergoes sustained and substantial changes along a democracy-autocracy continuum."

== V-Party dataset ==
The Varieties of Party Identity and Organization (V-Party) dataset is a database maintained by the V-Dem Institute that tracks the political positions and structures of political parties around the world The database includes parties around the world with over 5% of the vote in their respective systems in the period between 1970 and 2019.
