= Outline of democracy =

Overview of and topical guide to democracy

The following outline is provided as an overview of and topical guide to democracy.

Democracy – form of government which allows people to participate equally—either directly or through elected representatives—in the proposal, development, and creation of laws.

== Nature of democracy ==
Democracy can be described as a(n):

- Institution – structure or mechanism of social order and cooperation governing the behavior of a set of individuals within a given human community. Institutions are identified with a social purpose and permanence, transcending individual human lives and intentions, and with the making and enforcing of rules governing cooperative human behavior.
- Government – the legislators, administrators, and arbitrators in the bureaucracy who control a state at a given time and to the system of government by which they are organized.

== Types of democracy ==
The main types of democracy include the following:

- Direct democracy – the people decide (e.g. vote on, form consensus on) policy initiatives directly.
- Semi-direct democracy – a combination of direct and representative democracy. Politicians still exist, but citizens can make initiatives, referendums, and recalls.
- Representative democracy – elected officials represent a group of people. All modern Western-style democracies are types of representative democracies; for example, Germany is a parliamentary republic.

== History of democracy ==
History of democracy – democracy can be traced back from the present day to classical Athens in the 6th century BCE.

- Athenian democracy – democracy in the Greek city-state of Athens developed around the fifth century BCE, making Athens one of the first known democracies in the world, comprising the city of Athens and the surrounding territory of Attica. It was a system of direct democracy, in which eligible citizens voted directly on legislation and executive bills.
  - Solon (c. 638 – c. 558 BCE) – Athenian statesman, lawmaker, and poet. Legislated against political, economic, and moral decline in archaic Athens. His reforms failed in the short term, yet he is often credited with having laid the foundations for Athenian democracy.
  - Cleisthenes (born around 570 BCE) – father of Athenian democracy. He reformed the constitution of ancient Athens and set it on a democratic footing in 508/7 BCE.
  - Ephialtes (died 461 BCE) – led the democratic revolution against the Athenian aristocracy, which exerted control through the Areopagus, the most powerful body in the state. Ephialtes proposed a reduction of the Areopagus' powers, and the Ecclesia (the Athenian Assembly) adopted Ephialtes' proposal without opposition. This reform signaled the beginning of a new era of "radical democracy" for which Athens would become famous.
  - Pericles – arguably the most prominent and influential Greek statesman. When Ephialtes was assassinated for overthrowing the elitist Council of the Aeropagus, his deputy Pericles stepped in. He was elected strategos (one of ten such posts) in 445 BCE, which he held continuously until his death in 429 BCE, always by election of the Athenian Assembly. The period during which he led Athens, roughly from 461 to 429 BCE, is known as the "Age of Pericles".
  - Ostracism – procedure under the Athenian democracy in which any citizen could be expelled from the city-state of Athens for ten years.
  - Areopagus – council of elders of Athens, similar to the Roman Senate. Like the Senate, its membership was restricted to those who had held high public office, in this case that of Archon. In 594 BCE, the Areopagus agreed to hand over its functions to Solon for reform. Later, Ephialtes radically reduced its powers.
  - Ecclesia – principal assembly of the democracy of ancient Athens during its "Golden Age" (480–404 BCE). It was the popular assembly, open to all male citizens with 2 years of military service. In 594 BCE, Solon allowed all Athenian citizens to participate, regardless of class, even the thetes (manual laborers).
- Federalist Papers –
- Potsdam Declaration –
- Third Wave Democracy –

== Democratic process ==
=== Elections ===
- Election rules
  - Elective rights – include eligibility (the right to run for office, that is, the right to be a candidate), and suffrage (the civil right to vote gained through the democratic process).
  - Voting – a method for a group such as a meeting or an electorate to make a decision or express an opinion—often following discussions, debates, or election campaigns.
    - Crossover voting – a behavior in which voters who normally participate in the primary of one party instead vote in the primary of another party.
    - One vote, one value – a legislative principle of democracy whereby each electorate has the same population within a specified percentage of variance.
    - Right of foreigners to vote – voting rights extended to non-citizens.
    - Suffrage – the right to vote gained through the democratic process.
      - Universal suffrage
    - Voting system
      - Single winner system
      - Multiple winner system
      - Proxy voting
      - Secret ballot
- Electoral fraud – illegal interference with the process of an election. Acts of fraud affect vote counts to bring about an election result, whether by increasing the vote share of the favored candidate, depressing the vote share of the rival candidates, or both. Also called voter fraud, the mechanisms involved include illegal voter registration, intimidation at polls and improper vote counting. What electoral fraud is under law varies from country to country.
  - Show election – election that is held purely for show, that is, without any significant political purpose. Show elections are a common event in dictatorial regimes that still feel the need to establish some element of public legitimacy. Also known as a "sham election" or "rubber stamp election".
- Redistricting
  - Gerrymandering – manipulating geographic boundaries of electoral districts to establish a political advantage for a particular party or group in the form of partisan or incumbent-protected districts.
- Sortition – selection of decision makers by lottery. The decision-makers are chosen as a random sample from a larger pool of candidates. Also known as allotment or the drawing of lots.
- Types of elections
  - Primary election
  - General election
  - Runoff election
  - By-election – election held to fill a political office that has become vacant between regularly scheduled elections. Occasionally also spelled "bye-election", and known in the United States and the Philippines as a "special election".
  - Recall election
  - Referendum – direct vote in which an entire electorate is asked to either accept or reject a piece of legislation.
  - Retention election
  - Direct election
  - Indirect election
  - Local election
  - Fixed-term election
- Elections by country
- Elections by date

=== Lawmaking ===
- Parliamentary procedure – procedure governing the lawmaking process of a legislature.
- Administrative procedure – procedure governing how executive agencies that have been delegated lawmaking authority by a legislature create laws.
- Referendum – a direct vote in which an entire electorate is asked to either accept or reject a piece of legislation.

== Democratic concepts ==
- Accountability
- Anticipatory exclusion
- Compositing (democracy)
- Consensus democracy
- Democratic capitalism
- Democratic education
- Democratic consolidation
- Democratic deficit
- Democratic ideals
- Democratic socialism
- Democratic transhumanism
- Democratization
- Deviation from proportionality
- Direct representation
- E-participation
- Majority rule – decision rule that selects alternatives which have a majority, that is, more than half the votes. It is the binary decision rule used most often in influential decision-making bodies, including the legislatures of democratic nations.
- Proportional representation
- Tyranny of the majority
- Virtual representation

== Criticism of democracy ==
Criticism of democracy includes charges that democracy is either economically inefficient, politically idealistic, or morally corrupt.

== Media about democracy ==
=== Books about democracy ===
- America by Heart
- Bad for Democracy
- The Coming Victory of Democracy
- Considerations on Representative Government
- Democracy and Its Critics
- Democracy in America
- Democracy: The God That Failed
- Deterring Democracy
- The Disruption of American Democracy
- Failed States: The Abuse of Power and the Assault on Democracy
- Freedom and Culture
- Hermeneutic Communism
- How Democratic Is the American Constitution?
- How Voters Feel
- Is Democracy Possible? The alternative to electoral politics
- The Life and Death of Democracy
- Making Democracy Work
- Multitude: War and Democracy in the Age of Empire
- The Myth of the Rational Voter
- Of Grunge and Government
- Silencing Dissent
- The Structural Transformation of the Public Sphere
- The Third Wave: Democratization in the Late Twentieth Century
- The Voter Decides
- Who Governs?
- You Can't Be President

== See also ==
- Global Foundation for Democracy and Development (GFDD)
- Fundación Global Democracia y Desarrollo (FUNGLODE)
- Bureau of Democracy, Human Rights, and Labor
- Communalism
- Corsican Constitution
- Democracy indices
- Democracy promotion
- Democracy Ranking
- Democratic capitalism
- Direct Action and Democracy Today
- Education Index
- Elections in Cuba
- The End of History and the Last Man
- Four boxes of liberty
- Imperative mandate
- Intercultural cities
- International Centre for Democratic Transition
- Islam and democracy
- Isonomia
- A Jewish and Democratic State
- Kleroterion
- Mandate (politics)
- Motion (democracy)
- National Democratic Institute for International Affairs
- United Front for Democracy Against Dictatorship
- Netherlands Institute for Multiparty Democracy
- Office for Democratic Institutions and Human Rights
- Party of Internet Democracy
- Penn, Schoen & Berland
- Polity data series
- Post-democracy
- Potsdam Declaration
- Public sphere
- Ratification
- Singaporean communitarianism
- Synoecism
- Tharwa Foundation
- Theory of Deep Democracy
- Trustee model of representation
- Venezuelan Communal Councils
- Vox populi
- Why Democracy?
- World Bank's Inspection Panel
- World Forum for Democratization in Asia
- World on Fire
- World Youth Movement for Democracy
- Constitutional economics
- Community of Democracies
- Crowdsourcing
- Democracy Monument
- Democracy promotion
- Democratic Peace Theory
- Democratization
- Direct Action and Democracy Today
- Election
- Empowered democracy
- Foucault/Habermas debate
- Freedom deficit
- Freedom House – Freedom in the World report
- List of direct democracy parties
- Majority rule
- Thomas Muir (political reformer)
- Poll
- Panarchy
- Parliamentary democracy
- Polyarchy
- Sociocracy
- Sortition
- Subversion
- Rule of law
- Rule According to Higher Law
- Voting
