= Charles E. Lindblom =

American political scientist (1917–2018)

- Born: March 21, 1917
- Died: January 30, 2018 (aged 100); Santa Fe, New Mexico, U.S.
- Citizenship: American
- Education: University of Chicago
- Known for: incrementalism (muddling through), pluralism, comparative politics
- Scientific career
- Fields: Political science
- Workplaces: Yale University
- Doctoral advisor: Frank H. Knight
- Doctoral students: Joseph Carens

Charles Edward Lindblom (March 21, 1917 – January 30, 2018) was an American academic who studied economics at the University of Chicago and was Sterling Professor emeritus of political science and economics at Yale University. He served as president of the American Political Science Association and the Association for Comparative Economic Studies, as well as director of Yale's Institute for Social and Policy Studies.

== Academic work ==
Lindblom was one of the early developers and advocates of the theory of incrementalism in policy and decision-making. That view (also called gradualism) takes a "baby-steps," "muddling through," or "Echternach-theory" approach to decision-making processes. In it, policy change is, under most circumstances, evolutionary, rather than revolutionary. He came to that view through his extensive studies of welfare policies and trade unions throughout the industrialized world. Those views are set out in two articles separated by 20 years: "The Science Of 'Muddling Through'" (1959) and “Still Muddling, Not yet through” (1979), both of which were published in Public Administration Review.

Together with his friend, colleague, and fellow Yale Professor Robert A. Dahl, Lindblom was a champion of the polyarchy (or pluralistic) view of political elites and governance in the late 1950s and the early 1960s. According to that view, no single monolithic elite controls government and society but rather a series of specialized elites competing and bargaining with one another for control. It is this peaceful competition and compromise between elites in politics and the marketplace that drives free-market democracy and allows it to thrive.

However, Lindblom soon began to see the shortcomings of polyarchy with regard to democratic governance. When certain groups of elites gain crucial advantages, become too successful and begin to collude with one another instead of compete, polyarchy can easily turn into corporatism or oligarchy.

Lindblom died on January 30, 2018, at the age of 100.

=== Politics and Markets (1977) ===
In his best known work, Politics And Markets (1977), Lindblom notes the "privileged position of business in polyarchy". He also introduces the concept of "circularity", or "controlled volitions," in which "even in the democracies, masses are persuaded to ask from elites only what elites wish to give them." Thus, any real choices and competition are limited. Worse still, any development of alternative choices or even any serious discussion and consideration of them is effectively discouraged. An example is the political party system in the United States, which is almost completely dominated by two powerful parties, which often reduce complex issues and decisions to two simple choices. Related to that is the concurrent concentration of the mass communications media into an oligopoly, which effectively controls who gets to participate in the national dialogue and who suffers a censorship of silence.

Politics And Markets provoked a wide range of critical reactions that extended beyond the realms of academia. The Mobil Corporation took out a full-page ad in The New York Times to denounce it. This helped the book achieve greater notoriety, which in turn helped it get onto The New York Times Best Seller list, a rarity for a scholarly work. His criticism of democratic capitalism and polyarchy and his seeming praise for the political economy of Tito's Yugoslavia, Lindblom was (perhaps predictably) labeled a "closet communist" and a "creeping socialist" by conservative critics in the west. Marxist and communist critics chided him for not going far enough. Originally, Dahl too disagreed with many of Lindblom's observations and conclusions, but in a later work How Democratic Is the American Constitution?, he also became critical of polyarchy in general and its U.S. form in particular.

Lindblom elaborated on his work in a 1982 Journal of Politics article. According to Lindblom, it is difficult for politicians to implement change when those changes adversely affect those who control capital, who also create the conditions that determine the success of society. Unlike other actors, who must proactively advocate for and against policies, the owners of capital can, by virtue of their importance for society, shape public policy decisions.

In The Market System: What It Is, How It Works, and What to Make of It (2001), Lindblom echoed and expanded upon many of his concerns raised in Politics And Markets. The most important of them is that the market system is the best mechanism yet devised for creating and fostering wealth and innovation, but it is not very efficient at assigning non-economic values and distributing social or economic justice.

== Select bibliography ==
- Lindblom, Charles E. (1959), "The handling of norms in policy analysis", in Abramovitz, Moses; et al. (eds.), The allocation of economic resources: essays in honor of Bernard Francis Haley, Stanford, California: Stanford University Press, OCLC 490147128.
- Lindblom, Charles E. (1959), The science of 'muddling through'. Public Administration Review, 19, pp. 79–88.
- Lindblom, Charles E.; Braybrooke, David (1963), A strategy of decision: policy evaluation as a social process. Free Press.
- Lindblom, Charles E. (1965), The intelligence of democracy, Free Press.
- Lindblom, Charles E.; Dahl, Robert A. (1976), Politics, economics, and welfare: planning and politico-economic systems resolved into basic social processes, with a new preface by the authors. Chicago: University of Chicago Press.
- Lindblom, Charles E. (1977), Politics and markets: the world's political-economic systems, New York: Basic Books.
- Lindblom, Charles E. (1979), Still muddling, not yet through "Public Administration Review", 39, pp. 517–526.
- Lindblom, Charles E.; Cohen, David K. (1979), Usable knowledge: social science and social problem solving, New Haven : Yale University Press
- Lindblom, Charles E. (1984), The policy-making process (2nd edition), Englewood Cliffs, New Jersey: Prentice-Hall.
- Lindblom, Charles E. (1990), "Inquiry and change: the troubled attempt to understand and shape society", Yale University Press
- Lindblom, Charles E.; Woodhouse, Edward J. (1993), The policy-making process, 3rd. ed. Englewood Cliffs, New Jersey: Prentice Hall.
- Lindblom, Charles E. (2001), The market system: what it is, how it works, and what to make of it, Yale University Press.
- Blockland, Hans; Rune Premfors, and Ross Zucker (2018), "In Memoriam: Charles Edward Lindblom, APSA President (1980–1981)" PS: Political Science & Politics (Vol. 51, No.2, April 2018).
