= Postinternationalism =

Postinternationalism is a term coined by academic James N. Rosenau to describe "an apparent trend in which more of the interactions that sustain world politics unfold without the direct involvement of states". Postinternational approaches to international relations theory lay emphasis on the role of non-state actors, the existence of international norms as well as the process of globalisation and the existence of intrastate (rather than interstate) violence. As such postinternational approaches rejects many the tenets of realist approaches to international relations theory though it accepts that international politics is anarchic. Rosneau's paradigm of postinternationalism is sometimes referred to in academic literature as "turbulence theory".

== See also ==
- Postnationalism
