= Robert Dahl =

American political scientist (1915–2014)

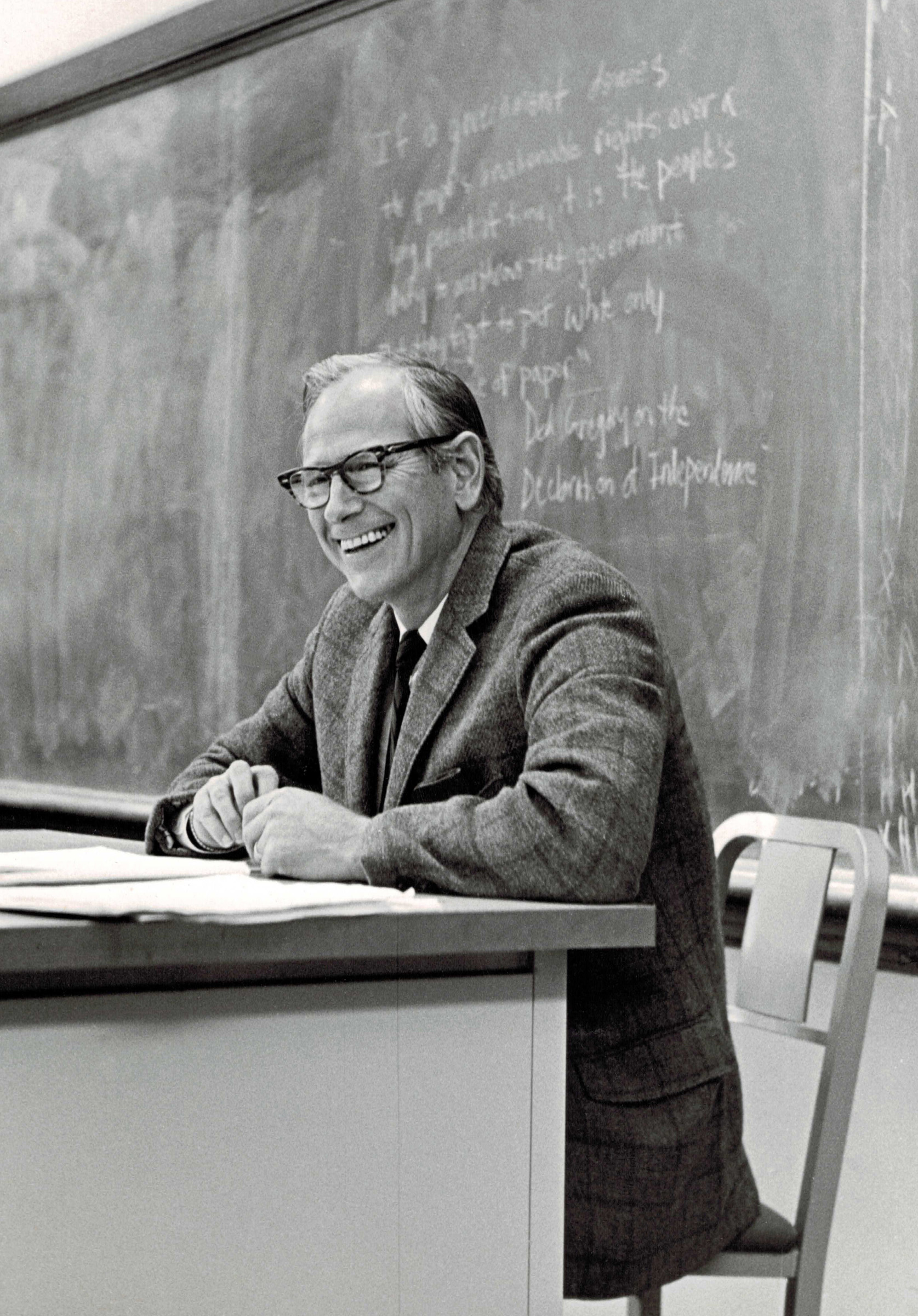
- Dahl teaching a political science class at Yale University
- Born: Robert Alan Dahl; December 17, 1915; Inwood, Iowa, U.S.
- Died: February 5, 2014 (aged 98); Hamden, Connecticut, U.S.
- Spouses: Mary Louise Bartlett (1940–1970); Ann Sale (1973–2014)
- Children: 5
- Awards: Johan Skytte Prize (1995)

Academic background
- Education: University of Washington (BA); Yale University (MA, PhD)
- Thesis: Socialist Programs and Democratic Politics: An Analysis (1940)
- Doctoral advisors: Francis Coker; Harvey Mansfield Sr.
- Influences: Kenneth Arrow; Léon Duguit; James Coleman; Carl Hempel

Academic work
- Discipline: Political science
- Sub-discipline: Political theory
- Institutions: Yale University
- Doctoral students: James Fishkin; Catharine MacKinnon; Nelson Polsby; Ian Shapiro; Edward Tufte; Ray Wolfinger; Jeffrey C. Isaac
- Notable students: Guillermo O'Donnell
- Main interests: Democracy; Democratization
- Notable ideas: Polyarchy; Pluralism
- Influenced: Charles Lindblom; Tom Malleson

Robert Alan Dahl (/dɑːl/; December 17, 1915 – February 5, 2014) was an American political theorist and Sterling Professor of Political Science at Yale University.

He established the pluralist theory of democracy—in which political outcomes are enacted through competitive, if unequal, interest groups—and introduced "polyarchy" as a descriptor of actual democratic governance. An originator of "empirical theory" and known for advancing behavioralist characterizations of political power, Dahl's research focused on the nature of decision making in actual institutions, such as American cities. He is the most important scholar associated with the pluralist approach to describing and understanding both city and national power structures.

In addition to his work on the descriptive theory of democracy, he was long occupied with the formulation of the constituent elements of democracy considered as a theoretical but realizable ideal. He has been credited to be a major theorist of democracy, with supporters praising what they claim to be the cogency, clarity and veracity of his portrayal of some of the key characteristics of ‘realizable-ideal’ democracy, as well as his descriptive analysis of the dynamics of modern pluralist-democracy.

== Biography ==
Dahl was born in Inwood, Iowa but grew up in Skagway, Alaska. His paternal grandfather Iver Pedersen Dal immigrated to the US in 1865 from the farm Dal Vestre at Snåsavatnet outside Steinkjer. Robert Dahl was aware of his Norwegian roots all his life and visited the ancestral home several times.

As a young man, Dahl worked as a loose worker on the railroad in Skagway. This long-term contact with local people became decisively important for his political attitudes and research interests.

He received his undergraduate degree from the University of Washington in 1936 and his Ph.D. from Yale in 1940.

After receiving his Ph.D., Dahl worked in the government in Washington DC and then volunteered for a spell in the US army. He served in Europe during World War II, was the leader of a small reconnaissance platoon in an infantry regiment, and earned a Bronze Star. He led a platoon that took part in a major offensive in November 1944.

After World War II, Dahl returned to Yale in 1946, where he was offered a temporary position teaching American government. The position became permanent, and Dahl remained at Yale his entire career, until his retirement in 1986. He was Eugene Meyer Professor of Political Science from 1955 to 1964, and Sterling Professor from 1964 to 1986. Dahl was departmental chair from 1957 to 1962.

Dahl served as president of the American Political Science Association in 1966/67.

Dahl was married to Mary Bartlett until her death in 1970, and then to Ann Sale, a Presbyterian.

== Awards and honors ==
Over his career, Dahl received many prestigious awards and prizes.

- 1950 Guggenheim fellow
- 1955–1956 Fellow of the Center for Advanced Study in the Behavioral Sciences
- 1960 American Academy of Arts and Sciences
- 1962 Dahl's book Who Governs? is awarded the 1962 Woodrow Wilson Foundation Book Award.
- 1967 Fellow of the Center for Advanced Study in Behavioral Sciences
- 1972 National Academy of Sciences
- 1978 Guggenheim fellow
- 1990 Dahl's work Democracy and Its Critics (1989) won the Woodrow Wilson Foundation Book Award.
- 1995 Dahl was the first recipient of the Johan Skytte Prize in Political Science in 1995.
- 2016 Robert A. Dahl Award was established in honor of Dr. Robert Dahl by the American Political Science Association in 2016.
- American Philosophical Society
- British Academy (as a corresponding fellow).

== Academic research ==
=== Early writings and pluralism ===
In his doctoral thesis in 1940, Dahl critiqued "corporate capitalism" and state socialism as both exemplifying undemocratic traits, arguing for economic democracy and a form of democratic socialism. A similar theme recurred in his A Preface to Economic Democracy in 1985.

Dahl's influential early books include A Preface to Democratic Theory (1956), Who Governs? (1961), and Pluralist Democracy in the United States (1967), which presented pluralistic explanations for political rule in the United States.

In the late 1950s and early 1960s, he was involved in an academic disagreement with C. Wright Mills over the nature of politics in the United States. Mills held that America's governments are in the grasp of a unitary and demographically narrow power elite. Dahl responded that there are many different elites involved, who have to work both in contention and in compromise with one another. If this is not democracy in a populist sense, Dahl contended, it is at least polyarchy (or pluralism). In perhaps his best known work, Who Governs? (1961), he examines the power structures (both formal and informal) in the city of New Haven, Connecticut, as a case study, and finds that it supports this view.

From the late 1960s onwards, his conclusions were challenged by scholars such as G. William Domhoff and Charles E. Lindblom (a friend and colleague of Dahl).

=== Writing on democracy and polyarchies ===
In Polyarchy, Dahl uses the term "polyarchy" to refer to actual cases of democracy and provides a comprehensive discussion of possible causes of polyarchy.

In his book, Democracy and Its Critics, Dahl clarifies his view about democracy. No modern country meets the ideal of democracy, which is as a theoretical utopia. More specifically, Dahl argued that five criteria could be used for evaluating how democratic a process is:

1. Effective participation - All members ought to have equal and effective opportunities to make their views known to other members.
2. Voting equality - All members ought to have an equal and effective opportunity to vote, with votes counted as equal.
3. Enlightened understanding - All members must have equal and effective opportunities to learn about the consequences and alternatives of a proposal.
4. Control of the agenda - All members must have the exclusive opportunity to choose if or how matters will be placed on the agenda.
5. Inclusion of adults - All or most of adult permanent residents should be given the full rights of the above four criteria.

However, as in his earlier book Polyarchy, Dahl held that some countries approximated those ideals and could be classified as "polyarchies" inasmuch as they had "seven institutions, all of which must exist for a government to be classified as a polyarchy":

1. Elected officials - "Control over government decisions about policy is constitutionally vested in elected officials."
2. Free and fair elections - "Elected officials are chosen in frequent and fairly conducted elections in which coercion is comparatively uncommon."
3. Inclusive suffrage - "Practically all adults have the right to vote in the election of officials."
4. Right to run for office - "Practically all adults have the right to run for elective offices in the government, though age limits may be higher for holding office than for the suffrage."
5. Freedom of expression - "Citizens have a right to express themselves without the danger of severe punishment on political matters broadly defined, including criticism of officials, the government, the regime, the socioeconomic order, and the prevailing ideology."
6. Alternative information - "Citizens have a right to seek out alternative sources of information. Moreover, alternative sources of information exist and are protected by laws."
7. Associational autonomy - "citizens ... have a right to form relatively independent associations or organizations, including independent political parties and interest groups."

=== Conditions favourable for democratic institutions ===
In his book On Democracy, Dahl sets out five conditions that favor democratic institutions. He deems three of them essential and the remaining two solely favourable.

Essential condition for democracy:

1. Control of military and police by elected officials
2. Democratic beliefs and political culture
3. No strong foreign control hostile to democracy

Favourable conditions for democracy:

1. A modern market economy and society
2. Weak subcultural pluralism

=== On the value of democracy ===
In his book On Democracy, Dahl addressed the question "Why should we support democracy?" and argued that "democracy has at least ten advantages" relative to nondemocracies:

1. Avoiding tyranny
2. Essential rights
3. General freedom
4. Self determination
5. Moral autonomy
6. Human development
7. Protecting essential personal interests
8. Political equality
9. Peace-seeking
10. Prosperity

=== Later writings ===
In his later writing, Dahl examined democracy, in particular in the United States, with a critical view.

In How Democratic Is the American Constitution? (2001), Dahl argued that the US Constitution is much less democratic than it ought to be, given that its authors were operating from a position of "profound ignorance" about the future. However, he adds that there is little or nothing that can be done about this "short of some constitutional breakdown, which I neither foresee nor, certainly, wish for."

In On Political Equality (2006), Dahl addresses the issue of equality and discusses how and why governments have fallen short of their democratic ideals. He assesses the contemporary political landscape in the United States.

== Major works ==
The best known of Dahl's works include:

- Dahl, Robert A. 1950. Congress and Foreign Policy. New York: Harcourt, Brace
- Dahl, Robert A.; Lindblom, Charles E. (1953). Politics, Economics, and Welfare: Planning and Politico-Economic Systems Resolved into Basic Social Process. New York: Harper and Brothers.
- Dahl, Robert (2006) [1956]. A Preface to Democratic Theory. Chicago: University of Chicago Press. ISBN 978-0-226-13434-5.
- Dahl, Robert A. (1957). "The Concept of Power." Systems Research and Behavioral Science 2(3), 201–215.
- Dahl, Robert A. (1957). "Decision-Making in a Democracy: The Supreme Court as a National Policy-Maker." Journal of Public Law 6: 279–295.
- Dahl, Robert A. (1960). Social science research on business: product and potential.
- Dahl, Robert A. (1961). Who Governs?: Democracy and Power in an American City.
- Dahl, Robert A. (1963). Modern Political Analysis.
- Dahl, Robert A. (1966). Political oppositions in Western Democracies.
- Dahl, Robert A. (1968). Pluralist democracy in the United States: conflict and consent.
- Dahl, Robert A. (1970). After the Revolution?: Authority in a good society.
- Dahl, Robert A. (1971). Polyarchy: participation and opposition. New Haven: Yale University Press. ISBN 978-0-300-01565-2.
- Dahl, Robert A.; Tufte, Edward R. (1973). Size and Democracy.
- Dahl, Robert A. (1983). Dilemmas of Pluralist Democracy: Autonomy vs. Control.
- Dahl, Robert A. (December 1984). "Polyarchy, pluralism, and scale". Scandinavian Political Studies. 7 (4): 225–240. doi:10.1111/j.1467-9477.1984.tb00304.x. Full text.
- Dahl, Robert A. (1985). A Preface to Economic Democracy.
- Dahl, Robert A. (1985). Controlling Nuclear Weapons: Democracy versus Guardianship.
- Dahl, Robert A. (1989). Democracy and Its Critics.
- Dahl, Robert A. (1997). Toward Democracy - a Journey: Reflections, 1940–1997.
- Dahl, Robert A. (1998). On Democracy.
- Dahl, Robert A. (2002). How Democratic Is the American Constitution?.
- Dahl, Robert A.; Shapiro, Ian; Cheibub, José Antonio, eds. (2003). The Democracy Sourcebook.
- Dahl, Robert A. (2005). After The Gold Rush.
- Dahl, Robert A. (2005). What Political Institutions Does Large-Scale Democracy Require?. Political Science Quarterly 120:2, pp. 187–197.
- Dahl, Robert A. (2006). On Political Equality.

== Resources on Dahl and his research ==
- Baldwin, David, and Mark Haugaard (eds.). 2018. Robert A. Dahl: An Unended Quest. Routledge.
- Blokland, Hans Theodorus. 2011. Pluralism Democracy and Political Knowledge. Robert a Dahl and His Critics on Modern Politics. Burlington, VT: Ashgate.
- Crothers, Charles H.G. 2015. "Dahl, Robert A (1915–2014)," pp. 655–60, in James Wright (ed.), International Encyclopaedia of Social and Behavioural Sciences, 2nd ed. Vol. 5, Elsevier.
- Dahl, Robert A. 2005. After the Goldrush: Growing up in Skagway. Xlibris Corporation. [A description by Dahl of his days growing up in Alaska.]
- Dahl, Robert A., and Margaret Levi. 2009. “A Conversation with Robert A. Dahl". Annual Review of Political Science 12: 1-9
- Fabbrini, Sergio. 2003. "Bringing Robert A. Dahl's Theory of Democracy to Europe." Annual Review of Political Science 6:1: 119-137.
- Fisichella, Domenico. 2009. “Robert Dahl: The Democratic Polyarchy,” pp. 11–36, in Donatella Campus and Gianfranco Pasquino (eds.), Masters of Political Science. Colchester, UK: ECPR Press.
- Mayhew, David. 2018. "A Biographical Memoir". National Academy of Sciences.
- Morriss, Peter (October 1972). "Power in New Haven: a reassessment of 'Who Governs?'". British Journal of Political Science. 2 (4): 457–465. doi:10.1017/S0007123407000221. JSTOR 193412. S2CID 45944770.
- Shapiro, Ian, and Grant Reeher (eds.). 1988. Power, Inequality, and Democratic Politics: Essays in Honor of Robert A. Dahl. Westview Press.
- Utter, Glenn H. and Charles Lockhart (eds.). 2002. American Political Scientists: A Dictionary (2nd ed.) pp 75–78, online.
- Interview by Richard Snyder. 2007. "Robert A. Dahl: Normative Theory, Empirical Research and Democracy," pp. 113–149, in Gerardo L. Munck and Richard Snyder, Passion, Craft, and Method in Comparative Politics. Baltimore, Md.: The Johns Hopkins University Press.

== See also ==
- Democracy
- Pluralism (political theory)
