= Who Governs? =

1961 book by Robert Dahl

Who Governs?: Democracy and Power in an American City
- Author: Robert Dahl
- Publisher: Yale University Press
- Publication date: 1961

Who Governs?: Democracy and Power in an American City is a book in American political science by Robert Dahl that was published in 1961 by Yale University Press. Dahl's work is a case study of political power and representation in New Haven, Connecticut. It is widely considered one of the great works of empirical political science of the 20th century.

Who Governs? is Dahl's claim as the leader of the pluralistic approach to politics. He argues that many interest groups compete in the political sphere, and the government's role is to act as the mediator between those groups. The central question that Dahl asks is who actually governs in a system in which every adult may vote, but knowledge, wealth, social position, access to officials and other resources are unequally distributed? Dahl contends that New Haven is a democratic community in which most residents are entitled to vote. However, there is an unequal distribution of the resources that can be used to influence voters. One answer is that competing parties govern with the consent of voters by competitive elections. Another theory is that interest groups govern. A third theory is that beneath the façade of democracy, the elite actually govern. Dahl criticized those theories for failing to recognize the power of leaders. He proposes that in a democracy, the masses and the leaders govern together.

Who Governs? is an influential contribution to scholarship on the concept of power. Dahl conceptualizes power as the ability of A to make B do something that the latter would not otherwise do. Peter Bachrach and Morton S. Baratz criticized Dahl's concept of power by arguing that it omitted agenda-setting powers and veto powers. Steven Lukes added that power may also entail that A influences B to the extent that B's preferences become altered to be consistent with A's preferences.
