= Pluralism (political theory) =

View of politics as governmental but under heavy influence of non-governmental groups

Pluralism is the political theory that politics and decision-making are located mostly in the framework of government but that many non-governmental groups use their resources to exert influence.

Under classical pluralist theory, groups of individuals try to maximize their interests through continuous bargaining processes and conflict. Because of the consequent distribution of resources throughout a population, inequalities may be reduced. At the same time, radical political change will be met with resistance due to the existence of competing interest groups, which collectively form the basis of a democratic equilibrium.

Theorists of pluralism include Robert A. Dahl, David Truman, and Seymour Martin Lipset.

== Definition ==
Pluralists believe that social heterogeneity prevents any single group from gaining dominance. Because of the long-term instability of coalitions, competition among competing interests groups is easily preserved.

Dahl describes power as a "realistic relationship, such as A's capacity for acting in such a manner as to control B's responses". In Dahl's view, because "political heterogeneity follows socioeconomic heterogeneity", social differentiation increasingly disperses power.

== Theories ==
=== Elite pluralism ===
Elite pluralism notes the presence of inequities due to elites holding greatly disproportionate societal power, or by systemic distortions of the political process itself, perpetuated by, for example, regulatory or cultural capture. Theories of elite pluralism have argued that representative democracy is flawed and tends to deteriorate towards particracy or oligarchy, by the iron law of oligarchy or otherwise.

=== Neo-pluralism ===
Neo-pluralism emerged as a challenge to classical pluralist theory. Neo-pluralist political scientist Charles E. Lindblom attributes primacy to the competition between interest groups in the policy process but recognizes the disproportionate influence business interests have in the policy process.

== In foreign policy ==
In international security, during the policymaking process, different parties may have a chance to take part in decision making. The party who has more power has more opportunity to gain even more power and increase the possibility of getting what it wants.

== Democratization ==
The Anti-Pluralism Index in V-Party Dataset is modeled as a lack of commitment to the democratic process, disrespect for fundamental minority rights, demonization of opponents, and acceptance of political violence. The V-Party Dataset demonstrates higher autocratization for high anti-pluralism.

== See also ==
- Agonism
- Corporatism
- Decision-making
- Distributism
- Foreign policy
- Elite theory
- International relations
- Legitimation crisis
- Marxism
- New institutionalism
- Polyarchy
- Salad bowl (cultural idea)
