= Democracy and Its Critics =

Political science book by Robert Dahl

- Author: Robert Dahl
- Language: English
- Genre: Non-fiction
- Publisher: Yale University Press
- Publication date: 1989
- Publication place: United States

Democracy and Its Critics is a book in American political science, written by Robert Dahl. The book was published by Yale University Press in 1989. In the following years Democracy and Its Critics won the 1991 Elaine and David Spitz Book Award and the 1990 Woodrow Wilson Foundation Book Award.

In the book, Dahl "examines the most basic assumptions of democratic theory, tests them against the questions raised by its critics, and recasts the theory of democracy into a new and coherent whole. He concludes by discussing the directions in which democracy must move if advanced democratic states are to exist in the future."

== See also ==
- Polyarchy
