= John Burnheim =

Australian philosopher (1927–2023)

John Bernard Burnheim (20 April 1927 – 26 October 2023) was an Australian philosopher who was Professor of General Philosophy at the University of Sydney.

== Biography ==
John Bernard Burnheim was born in Sydney on 20 April 1927. He left school to become a Catholic priest in 1942 and was ordained in 1949. He left the church after it shifted back towards what he considered a more authoritarian leadership style. From 1958 to 1968, he was rector of St John's, the Catholic college attached to the university. He became a major figure in the disturbances of the 1970s that split the university's Department of Philosophy. He lectured in Philosophy at the University of Sydney from 1960–1990. He was a founding member of the Sydney Film Festival. Burnheim died in Camperdown on 26 October 2023, at the age of 96.

== Sortition ==
=== Is Democracy Possible? The alternative to electoral politics ===
According to The Age, Is Democracy Possible? has continued to garner international attention since it was published in 1985 and reprinted in 2008. Burnheim continued to work on and refine his ideas outlined in the book into his 90's.

In his book Is Democracy Possible? The alternative to electoral politics (1985) Burnheim used the term "demarchy" (created by Friedrich Hayek in his Law, Legislation and Liberty) to describe a political system without the state or bureaucracies, and based instead on randomly selected groups of decision makers. This has striking resemblances to classical democratic ideas, as reported by Thucydides. In 2006 Burnheim published a second edition with a new preface in which he directed the reader to an emphasis that "a polity organised by negotiation between specialised authorities would work much better than one based on centralised authority".

Demarchy as Burnheim conceives it has two features that distinguish it from other proposals for selection by lot in politics:

- First, an insistence on putting distinct policy areas under mutually independent authorities which would settle problems of coordination between them by negotiation or arbitration rather than by dictation from above. The point of this is to remedy the defect of existing democracies in which issues are settled according to the power strategies of politicians rather than the merits of the case;
- Second, that the committee in charge of each policy body should be statistically representative of those who are most substantially affected by their decisions. The hope is that this would lead to better decisions, not just the wishful thinking of populist spin.

=== The Demarchy Manifesto: for better public policy ===
In 2016 John Burnheim published The Demarchy Manifesto: for better public policy. Where Is Democracy Possible is theoretical, the manifesto suggests a practical approach to current problems, aimed at divorcing the process of "enlightening, articulating and giving effect to public opinion" on selected issues of policy from the electoral party system. It envisaged setting up a public foundation, financed by private contributions, to conduct the proceedings, relying on the complete transparency and participatory amplitude of its proceedings to justify its claim to articulate a view that deserves to be seen as serious public opinion on a range of important matters. The key to complete openness is a website where anybody who chooses to do so may contribute, dedicated to deciding the best way of dealing with a specific problem. Contributors would be expected to appeal to considerations that most people would accept as directly relevant to the particular problem. The editors would attempt to see that all the considerations that either ordinary people or experts might have were thoroughly debated, establishing the considerations a good solution should take into account. That discussion should lead to clarity about just what facts and values are relevant, but still leave a lot of disagreement about the relative weight placed on them in articulating an acceptable decision. A second small body would be charged with attempting to arrive at a practical compromise between conflicting considerations. The suggestion is that this should be a small committee, statistically representative of the interests most strongly advantaged or disadvantaged by what is to be decided. This body would also operate entirely by correspondence online, open to comment at every stage. The book tries to tie this proposal up with a realistic approach to the more general issues of public goods, practical uncertainty, social processes and global problems.

== Other notable works ==
- Burnheim J. (2016). The Demarchy Manifesto: for better public policy, Imprint Academic, UK, SUP Australia
- Burnheim J. (2011) To Reason Why (A memoir)

== See also ==
- Citizens' assembly
- Deliberative democracy
- Sortition
