= James N. Rosenau =

American political scientist (1924–2011)

James N. Rosenau (November 25, 1924 – September 9, 2011) was an American political scientist and international affairs scholar. He served as president of the International Studies Association from 1984 to 1985.

== Life ==
His scholarship and teaching focused on the dynamics of world politics and the overlap between domestic and foreign affairs. He was the author of scores of articles and more than 35 books, including Turbulence in World Politics: A Theory of Change and Continuity (Princeton University Press, 1990) and Along the Domestic-Foreign Frontier: Exploring Governance in a Turbulent World (Cambridge, 1997). His book Distant Proximities: Dynamics Beyond Globalization completed a trio on globalization, and was published by Princeton University Press in 2003.

Rosenau was among the first to apply the model of complex systems, a model originating in the physical sciences, as an interdisciplinary model for political science and international affairs. A November/December 2005 publication in Foreign Policy magazine listed Rosenau as among the most influential scholars in the field of International Affairs.

Arriving at the University of Southern California Dornsife in 1973, Rosenau served as director of the USC School of International Relations from 1976 to 1979. He left USC Dornsife in 1992 and was appointed University Professor of International Affairs at George Washington University in Washington, D.C. Rosenau then served as University Professor of International Affairs at the George Washington University's Elliott School of International Affairs until his death in 2011. He was a Democrat.

His final book, "People Count! The Networked Individual in World Politics" was published in October 2007.

== Bibliography ==
- Turbulence in World Politics: A Theory of Change and Continuity (Princeton University Press, 1990)
- Governance Without Government (1992)
