= Four boxes of liberty =

Concept that liberty rests on four boxes: soap, ballot, jury and cartridge

The four boxes of liberty is a 19th-century American idea that proposes there are four boxes to be used in the defense of liberty: soap, ballot, jury, and cartridge (or ammo).

Concepts and phrases evolve and are applied in new ways. The "four boxes" phrase always includes the ballot, jury, and cartridge (or ammo) boxes. Additional boxes, when specified, have sometimes been the bandbox, soapbox, moving box, or lunch box. The phrase in various forms has been used in arguments about tariff abolition, the rights of African Americans, women's suffrage, environmentalism, and gun control.

The soap box represents exercising one's right to freedom of speech to influence politics to defend liberty. The ballot box represents exercising one's right to vote to elect a government which defends liberty. The jury box represents using jury nullification to refuse to convict someone being prosecuted for breaking an unjust law that decreases liberty. The cartridge box represents exercising one's right to keep and bear arms to oppose, in armed conflict, a tyrannical government. The four boxes represent increasingly forceful methods of political action.

== Origins ==
Stephen Decatur Miller may have originated the concept during a speech at Stateburg, South Carolina, in September 1830. He said "There are three and only three ways to reform our Congressional legislation, familiarly called, the ballot box, the jury box, and the cartridge box". This became his campaign slogan in his successful bid for the Senate on a platform advocating the abolition of tariffs. An 1849 edition of the Family Favorite and Temperance Journal extended the concept: "Four boxes govern the world:—cartridge box, ballot box, jury box, and band box". The bandbox, originally designed to hold collar bands, was used to carry the elaborate women's hats of the time as well as many other personal items. The quip was reproduced in the 25 December 1869 edition of the Spirit of the Times newspaper and in the 1881 Treasury of wisdom, wit and humor, odd comparisons and proverbs.

=== African American versions ===
William F. Butler, an African-American leader, used the concept in a speech he delivered in November 1867 in Lexington, Kentucky, saying: "First we had the cartridge box, now we want the ballot box, and soon we will get the jury box". Butler was referring to the fact that African Americans had fought in the U.S. military in the American Civil War, but were still facing opposition to being treated as full citizens.

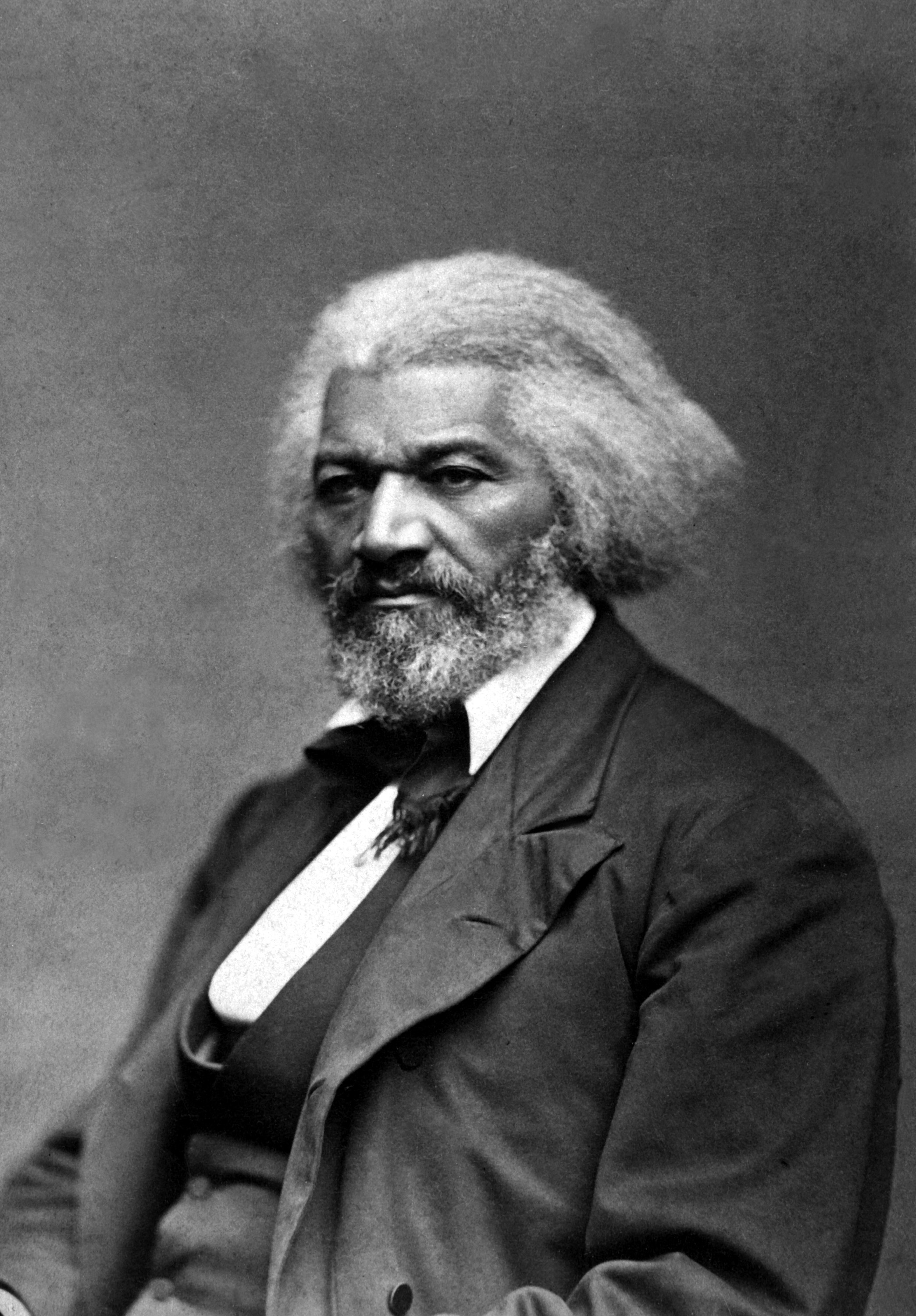
Frederick Douglass (1818–1895)

A version that is close to the modern forms was introduced by Frederick Douglass, an escaped slave who became an influential public figure in the Union States and United Kingdom before the U.S. Civil War, and had a long and distinguished career after the war. In a speech delivered on 15 November 1867, Douglass said "A man's rights rest in three boxes. The ballot box, jury box and the cartridge box. Let no man be kept from the ballot box because of his color. Let no woman be kept from the ballot box because of her sex".

In Douglass's autobiography the Life and Times of Frederick Douglass, published in 1892, he described his conviction that a freedman should become more than just a freedman, and should become a citizen. He repeated that "the liberties of the American people were dependent upon the ballot-box, the jury-box, and the cartridge-box; that without these no class of people could live and flourish in this country..."

=== Feminist versions ===
The Altamont Enterprise revived the old saw of the cartridge box, ballot box and bandbox in 1909 when reporting a discussion between the newspaper editor Horace Greeley and the early campaigner for women's rights, Elizabeth Cady Stanton. Greeley proposed that the bullet box and ballot box went together, and asked Stanton if she would be prepared to fight if she had the vote. Stanton retorted that she would fight as he did, with her pen. The article went on to describe the case of Abigail Hopper Gibbons, who as a landowner and taxpayer was sent an official form asking her to give reasons why she was not eligible for jury duty. She replied, "I know of none". However, at this time women were barred from the jury box, the ballot box and the cartridge box.

Some women rejected the feminist position. The anti-suffragette Emily Bissell saw involvement in the boxes of liberty as inappropriate for women. She wrote "The vote is part of man's work. Ballot-box, cartridge box, jury box, sentry box all go together in his part of life. Women cannot step in and take the responsibilities and duties of voting without assuming his place very largely".

== Commentary ==
In a commentary on Leonard Levy's book Origins of the Bill of Rights (1999), Professor Brian C. Kalt of the Michigan State University College of Law argues that the saying simply expresses the intent of the United States Bill of Rights to enshrine and protect the popular sovereignty. It succinctly defines the four methods by which the people can stand up for their rights.

Taking a less positive view of the idea, in April 2010 the Anti-Defamation League noted that it is frequently used by anti-government extremists to justify violence to gain their ends on the grounds that all else has failed, and cites a typical comment on the Pat Dollard Web Site: "we've tried the soap box & the ballot box to no avail. Maybe it's time to start thinking INSIDE the box – the bullet box".

In their book For the People: What the Constitution Really Says About Your Rights, Akhil Reed Amar and Alan Hirsch introduce a variation on the theme. Discussing the American Constitution, they assert that the ideal of citizenship generates four "boxes" of rights. The first three are the familiar ballot box, jury box and cartridge box. To these, with some reservations, they add the lunch box: the idea of a social safety net that supports basic physical and educational needs.

== Modern usage ==
Time reported that the saying was used in September 1976 by a keynote speaker at a convention of the American Independent Party, a coalition of right-wing forces. Although delegates disagreed on some issues, including the extent to which the U.S. should be active in foreign affairs, all agreed with the saying. During a March 1991 dinner event organized by the Green River Cattlemen's Association in Wyoming, James G. Watt said, "If the troubles from environmentalists cannot be solved in the jury box or at the ballot box, perhaps the cartridge box should be used."

Larry McDonald, a politician from Georgia and former president of the John Birch Society has also been quoted, omitting the caution to use bullets as the last resort: "We have four boxes with which to defend our freedom: the soap box, the ballot box, the jury box, and the cartridge box". The term is used in newspaper articles, and has been used in a petition to the Supreme Court of California. "Four boxes" and derivatives have been used in the name of various websites that espouse patriotism and the right to bear arms.

== See also ==
- The Ballot or the Bullet, a speech by Malcolm X
- Four Freedoms
- Gun politics
- Gun law in the United States
- National Rifle Association
