= Polyarchy =

Political rule by multiple people

In political science, the term polyarchy, literally ”rule by many” (from Greek: "poly" many, "arkhe" rule) was used by Robert Dahl to describe a form of government in which power is invested in multiple people. It takes the form of neither a dictatorship nor a democracy. This form of government was first implemented in the United States and France and gradually adopted by other countries. Polyarchy is different from democracy, according to Dahl, because the fundamental democratic principle is "the continuing responsiveness of the government to the preferences of its citizens, considered as political equals" with unimpaired opportunities. A polyarchy is a form of government that has certain procedures that are necessary conditions for following the democratic principle.

In semblance, the word "polycracy" describes the same form of government, although from a slightly different premise: a polycracy is a society ruled by more than one person, as opposed to a monocracy. The word derives from Greek poly ("many") and kratos ("power" or "strength").

== Definitions ==
Dahl's original theory of polyarchal democracy is in his 1956 book A Preface to Democratic Theory. His theory evolved over the decades, and the description in later writings is somewhat different.

Dahl argues that "democracy" is an ideal type that no country has ever achieved. For Dahl, democracy is a system that is "completely responsive to all its citizens", and the closest to the democratic ideal any country has come is polyarchy.

=== A Preface to Democratic Theory ===
In the book, Dahl gives eight conditions that measure the extent to which majority rule is in effect in an organization. These are (p. 84):

- Every member of the organization performs the acts we assume to constitute an expression of preference among the scheduled alternatives, e.g., voting.
- In tabulating these expressions (votes), the weight assigned to each individual is identical.
- The alternative with the greatest number of votes is declared the winning choice.
- Any member who perceives a set of alternatives, at least one of which he regards as preferable to any of the alternatives presently scheduled, can insert his preferred alternative(s) among those scheduled for voting.
- All individuals possess identical information about the alternatives.
- Alternatives (leaders or policies) with the greatest number of votes displace any alternatives (leaders or policies) with fewer votes.
- The orders of elected officials are executed.
- Either all interelection decisions are subordinate or executory to those arrived at during the election stage, i.e., elections are in a sense controlling; or new decisions during the interelection period are governed by the preceding seven conditions, operating, however, under rather different institutional circumstances; or both.

Dahl hypothesized that each of these conditions can be quantified, and suggested the term "polyarchy" to describe an organization that scores high on the scales for all the eight conditions.

Dahl viewed polyarchy as a system that manages to supply a high level of inclusiveness and a high level of liberalization to its citizens.

=== Democracy and its critics ===
In his 1989 book Democracy and Its Critics, Dahl gives the following characteristics of a polyarchy (p. 233):

- Control over governmental decisions about policy is constitutionally vested in elected officials.
- Elected officials are chosen and peacefully removed in relatively frequent, fair and free elections in which coercion is quite limited.
- Practically all adults have the right to vote in these elections.
- Most adults also have the right to run for the public offices for which candidates run in these elections.
- Citizens have an effectively enforced right to freedom of expression, particularly political expression, including criticism of the officials, the conduct of the government, the prevailing political, economic, and social system, and the dominant ideology.
- They also have access to alternative sources of information that are not monopolized by the government or any other single group.
- Finally, they have an effectively enforced right to form and join autonomous associations, including political associations, such as political parties and interest groups, that attempt to influence the government by competing in elections and by other peaceful means.

== Characteristics ==
Polyarchy and its procedures may be insufficient for achieving full democracy. For example, poor people may be unable to participate in the political process. Some authors see polyarchy as a form of government that is not intended for greater social justice or cultural realization or to allow the repressed to politically participate.

According to William I. Robinson, it is a system where a small group actually rules on behalf of capital, and the majority’s decision-making is confined to choosing among a select number of elites within tightly controlled elective processes. It is a form of consensual domination made possible by the structural domination of the global capital, which allows concentration of political power. Robert A. Dahl and Charles E. Lindblom noted that political bargaining is an essential feature of polyarchy, particularly in the US.

Moreover, a perceived polyarchy—such as the United States—may bar a substantial number of its citizens from participating in its electoral process. For example, more than four million U.S. citizens residing in the U.S. territories, such as Puerto Rico, Guam and the U.S. Virgin Islands, are excluded from participating in the election of any voting member of Congress, the political body that holds ultimate sovereignty over them. Robinson argues that they are effectively taxed without lawful representation (although these territories' status is a matter of popular consensus in individual cases).

In Preface to Democratic Theory (1956), Dahl argues that an increase in citizen political involvement may not always be beneficial for polyarchy. An increase in the political participation of members of less educated classes, for example, could reduce the support for the basic norms of polyarchy, because members of those classes are more predisposed to be authoritarian-minded.

In a discussion of contemporary British foreign policy, Mark Curtis writes, "Polyarchy is generally what British leaders mean when they speak of promoting 'democracy' abroad. This is a system in which a small group actually rules and mass participation is confined to choosing leaders in elections managed by competing elites."

It is also being promoted by the transnational elites in the South as a different form from the authoritarianism and dictatorship to the North as a part of democracy promotion. Robinson argues that this is to cultivate transnational elites who will open up their countries following the transnational agenda of neoliberalism, whereby transnational capital mobility and globalized circuits of production and distribution are established. For example, it was promoted to Nicaragua, Chile, Haiti, the Philippines, South Africa and the former Soviet Bloc countries.

== See also ==
- Civil society
- Free and fair election
- Governance
- Hoi polloi
- State/Space theory

== Sources ==
- Dahl, Robert A. (1956). A preface to democratic theory. Chicago: The University of Chicago Press. ISBN 9780226134253.
- Dahl, Robert A. (1971). Polyarchy: participation and opposition. New Haven: Yale University Press. ISBN 9780300015652.
- Dahl, Robert A. (December 1984). "Polyarchy, pluralism, and scale". Scandinavian Political Studies. 7 (4): 225–240. doi:10.1111/j.1467-9477.1984.tb00304.x. Full text.
- Brown, Seyom (1988). New forces, old forces, and the future of world politics. Glenview, Illinois: Scott, Foresman/Little Brown College Division, Scott Foresman. ISBN 9780673397096.
- Rosenau, James N.; Czempiel, Ernst-Otto, eds. (1992). Governance without government: order and change in world politics. Cambridge Studies in International Relations Series. Cambridge England New York: Cambridge University Press. ISBN 9780521405782.
- Robinson, William I. (1996). Promoting polyarchy: globalization, US intervention, and hegemony. Cambridge Studies in International Relations Series. Cambridge England New York: Cambridge University Press. ISBN 9780521566919.
- de Bellis, Gian Piero (2000). "Polyarchy: a manifesto". polyarchy.org. Gian Piero de Bellis.
- Robinson, William I. (October 1996). "Globalisation: nine theses on our epoch". Race & Class. 38 (2): 13–31. doi:10.1177/030639689603800202. S2CID 144082874. Pdf.
- Gills, Barry; Rocamora, Joel; Wilson, Richard, eds. (1993). Low intensity democracy: political power in the new world order. London Boulder, Colorado: Pluto Press. ISBN 9780745305363.
- Robinson, William I. (June 2013). "Promoting polyarchy: 20 years later". International Relations. 27 (2): 228–234. doi:10.1177/0047117813489655a. S2CID 147183107.
