= Is Democracy Possible? =

2006 book by John Burnheim

- Author: John Burnheim
- Publication date: 1985

Is Democracy Possible? The Alternative to Electoral Politics is a book by the Australian philosopher John Burnheim which outlines an alternative to electoral democracy. Originally published in 1985, the work was subsequently published with a new introduction in 2006, and again as a kindle e-book in 2014.

== Reception ==
The Age reviewer Colin Howard praised the book for being "an original and highly practical contribution to the theory of democratic government". He continued, "The combination of devastating analysis of what we actually have and rigorous construction of what we might have makes this one of the best books on government and the individual which this reviewer has read in a long time." The academic Sydney D. Bailey called the book a "wide-ranging, well organized, competently argued thesis". The philosopher Ágnes Heller found the work to be "an original contribution to contemporary debates about the possibility and nature of democracy". According to the political theorist Philip Pettit, the book is "a brisk, deftly written statement of a novel and arresting thesis".

The political scientist Jane Mansbridge penned a positive review of the book, writing, "Burnheim should be read not only for his telling critique of existing institutions, not only for his consistent sensitivity to the actual problems of decision making, and not only for his provocative espousal of negotiation and lot, but for the force of this larger vision." Janet Ajzenstat, a professor of political science at McMaster University, stated, "Although this book will provide little guidance to Canadians trying understand our own very different path to 'gender justice,' it effectively illuminates the problems of liberalism in the US, trying to be the 'nice cop' in the face of the insistence of feminists and the New Right alike to argue the substance of the politics of gender."

According to the obituary of Burnheim in The Age, Is Democracy Possible? has continued to garner international attention since it was published in 1985 and reprinted in 2008. Burnheim continued to work on and refine his ideas outlined in the book into his 90's.

== Summary ==
There are three central components to the position elaborated in the book, each of which marks a radical departure from traditional and contemporary analyses of the problems that confront us.

The first two components comprise the anti-state and the anti-communalist nature of the position to be developed. Burnheim is against giving sovereignty to any geographically or ethnically circumscribed group, a position which runs against the major tradition of political philosophy and the course of political history. Individuals in Burnheim's polity would see themselves as part of many diverse social activities and functional communities rather than any simple inclusive community. In this sense, despite the turn away from communalist understandings of the political sphere, collective identities remain centrally important to Burnheim. The third component concerns the introduction of Burnheim's notion of demarchy, most notably his rejection of electoral democracy in favour of statistical representation.

=== Against the state ===
First, Burnheim rejects the centrality of the state, both to political thought and to the practical overcoming of our current situation. Centrally controlled multi-function agencies provide the current model for the exercise of political and administrative power, from the nation state down to municipal local government. This model undermines the ability of decision makers to grapple with the solution of problems at the level at which they may be resolved effectively. Decisions currently made within such multifunction agencies could be taken instead by autonomous, specialised agencies coordinated by negotiation amongst themselves. In the modern world many of these authorities would need to have global scope.

=== Against communitarian alternatives ===
Second, democratic practice does not require participation by the people as a whole. What is required is that all those individuals materially affected by decisions in a given functional area should be represented and that they have the opportunity to participate in those decisions. This raises the problem of what interests in any given case are to be accepted as legitimate. Burnheim notes that this problem is hardly ever addressed by democratic theorists. That each person should have the opportunity to influence decisions on any matter affecting their legitimate interests seems straightforward, but Burnheim insists that the converse thesis also holds and is generally ignored in discussions of democratic practice: nobody should have input into decisions where they have no legitimate material interest. If this requirement is shelved the result simply is tyranny, "in the strict sense". Burnheim adds that all present forms of democracy, as well as all proposed forms, not only permit but encourage such tyranny. The practice of vote trading by political operatives is the result - trading my vote on an issue upon which I have no interest for another vote on an issue that concerns me deeply.

=== Demarchy: statistical representation ===
The third component contains the perhaps startling separation of democracy from electoral representation. The history of modern democracies has been the spread of competitive elections and the ever-widening electoral base. Universal adult suffrage is now taken as a given but the history of its achievement was a history of struggle. For Burnheim the very process of electoral representation leads to poor decisions determined by power-trading rather than the needs of those most affected. Democracy is possible only if decision makers are a representative sample of the people concerned. This would mean abandoning elections in favour of the ancient principle of choosing by lot so that decision-making bodies would statistically representative of those affected by their decisions. Coordination between diverse authorities would be by negotiation, or, if necessary, arbitration, rather than by centrally imposed decisions. What is hoped is that just as the market supplies our needs for private consumption goods by decentralised processes, our needs for public goods could also be supplied in highly flexible and responsive decentralised ways.

Initially such a polity might begin to emerge from the well-established practice of setting up citizen juries to advise on policy in specific matters. In the longer term the structuring of committees and their procedures would be open to challenge from those who thought their interests under-represented, and such disputes would be decided by tribunals chosen by lot from a pool of people nominated by their peers on operating committees as having the requisite qualities to carry out a judicial role.

== External references ==
- Burnheim J "Is Democracy Possible? Online Content" SETIS University of Sydney.
