= The Life and Death of Democracy =

2009 book by John Keane

- Author: John Keane
- Cover artist: Jem Butcher
- Language: English
- Subjects: History; Politics; Democracy
- Publisher: Simon & Schuster
- Publication date: 2009
- Publication place: United Kingdom and United States
- Media type: Print (hardcover)
- Pages: 992
- ISBN: 978-0-7432-3192-3
- OCLC: 225432107

The Life and Death of Democracy is a 2009 book by John Keane published in the UK by Simon & Schuster. Keane claims his book is the first attempt to write a full history of democracy for well over a century.

Keane's book deals with the meaning and institutions of democracy, historical roots, its present-day trends and all the ways democracies have gone wrong over the course of history.

== Keane's idea of Democracy ==
=== Birthplace of democracy ===
The starting point in Keane's history is to reconsider the roots of democracy. Fifth century BCE Athens (Greece), considered by many to be the cradle of democracy, was an important era in the development of democracy, but certainly not its point of origin. The origin of the idea of this new way of governing stretch beyond the Peloponnesus' coasts and dates back to the ancient civilizations of Syria-Mesopotamia (ca. 2500 BCE).

The book unearths many discoveries which are not a merely antiquarian exercise, for it is argued that these are historical facts that force us to rethink some of the core ideas that have influenced historians of the past, and, more importantly, shape the politics of the present. Keane not only proposes that democratic assemblies have Eastern origins but also strongly questions the old assumption that democracy is a universal norm that reflects Western values. Keane argues that the future of democracy is not tied neither to the West, nor to representative democracy, its currently the most widely adopted form. See for instance, the history of India, which shows the possibilities of multi-ethnic democracies, and of Islam, that many consider the antithesis of democracy, but which instead has a neglected democratic tradition.

The book tries to locate the family of origin of the word democracy and tries to explore the evolution and mutations of the language and institutions of democracy through the centuries. It also takes up the varied and disputed meanings of the word. Looking beyond the Athens-Runnymede-Philadelphia axis, Keane traces democracy's roots back to Sumeria and follows its tendrils as far afield as Pitcairn Island and Papua New Guinea.

=== Rethinking democracy in the context of world history ===
At the core of Keane's book is the author's belief that history is a necessary key for understanding democracy in the present time. Keane's worldwide perspective is an important corrective to the (mainly Western) idea that democracy has one and only distinctive form; one type of model that can be brought as a gift to people with different attitudes and histories. There is no such a thing as a singular form of democracy. Following the line of thinking that history is the only way we can make sense of what democracy means, The Life and Death of Democracy provides fresh details of the obscure origins of old institutions and ideals like government by public assembly, female enfranchisement, the secret ballot, trial by jury, and parliamentary representation.

Keane's book also shows that ideas of democratic governance have flourished in many different places and were often sparked by undemocratic ideas and actions. The road to democracy was often paved by opposite intentions. For instance, Keane shows that one effect of the early Islamic expansion was the creation of self-governing communities that needed to exist independently from the metropolis. The first experiments in female suffrage were made on the fringes of the British Empire: for imperial reasons, women were given the vote on Pitcairn Island in 1838. Furthermore, Keane's historical works shows that those fringes were important laboratories of democracy. Australia is a case in point: "In the colony of South Australia, first settled in 1836 and later called by many the Paradise of Dissent, the spirit of aristocracy was extinguished by settlers who thought of themselves as fair-minded, God-respecting men and women of the improving classes". And Australians were the first to experiment with ideas of proportional representation and the secret ballot.

An important mainstay of Keane's account of the history of democracy is the need to understand the inner fragility of democracy – in fact for the author that is a precondition for the survival of democracy. By 1941, in fact as Keane points out, there were only 11 functioning democracies left in the world. In less than 50 years, the work of many dictators and demagogues in the name of 'the people' had almost succeeded in wiping democracy from the pages of our history books. The present time is no different, Keane warns: "the enemies of democracy are on the rise".

=== Democracy as a culture and a mindset ===
From Keane's history, democracy emerges less as a set of fixed principles and much more as a culture and mindset—pragmatic, anti-authoritarian, accepting of change and contingency and the ability of ordinary people to shape them. Democracy is first and foremost a uniquely humble and humbling way of life. Keane says that democracy thrives on humility and not on the arrogance of first principles. However, the author warns that the humility should never be confused with docile meekness or submission, but it must be taken as the cardinal democratic virtue, the antidote of arrogant pride: it is the quality of being aware of one's own and others' limits. Keane regards that humility is the crucial element of democratic life as the people who are humble try to live without illusions, dislike vanity, and dishonesty. They dislike the nonsense on stilts and hate the lies and bullshit sitting on thrones.

Keane asserts that it is crucial to rid democracy of its demons and speak of it only in terms of humbling. He writes "to redescribe the democratic ideal as a potentially universal check against every form of humbug and hubris, as a humble and humbling ideal that gathers strength from the vision that, although citizens and representatives require institutions to govern, no body should rule."

== Structure ==
=== Three phases of democratic history ===
In The Life and Death of Democracy, Keane argues that the history of democracy can be divided into three different phases. These correspond to three different governing models: the assembly, the representative, and the monitory. The first two are quite known, the third is the brainchild of Keane's study of the subject. Accordingly, the book is divided into three different sections.

=== The Assembly Model ===
The first section deals with the origins of democracy and the Assembly Model. It locates the origins of public assemblies not in Athens but in the Middle East two thousands years before Pericles. And from that original cradle in Syria and Mesopotamia, early assembly democracy slowly moved westwards, through Phoenicia into the Greek world, where it was to be claimed as a Greek invention.

"The little word democracy" Keane writes "is much older than classical Greek commentators made out". The author traces its roots to the Linear B script of the Mycenaean period, seven to ten centuries earlier, to the late Bronze Age civilization (c. 1500-1200 BCE) that was centred on Mycenae and other urban settlements of the Peloponnese region. Similarly, Keane adds, contrary to what other scholars have pointed out, "the democratic practice of self-governing assemblies is also not a Greek innovation" but instead its roots are to be found in the 'East' and, more specifically, in Mesopotamia, lands that geographically correspond to contemporary Syria, Iraq and Iran.

=== The Representative Model ===
The second part of the book is dedicated to the invention of the Representative Model. Shaped by forces as varied as the rebirth of towns, the rise (in northern Spain) of the first parliaments, and the conflicts unleashed by self-governing councils and religious dissent within the Christian Church, democracy came to be understood as representative democracy in this second phase. Contrary to what other sources have often suggested, Keane points out that the oldest roots of that democratic model are in fact undemocratic. The first parliament was not English, but Spanish. Keane locates the birth of representative parliaments in the cloisters of San Isidoro Church, in León, Northern Spain - the site where King Alfonso IX convened the first Cortes in 1188 CE.

Yet it took several centuries before the term representation began to be used in conjunction with democracy. The birthplace of talk of 'representative democracy' – unknown to the Greeks - was late-eighteenth century France, England, and the new American republic. To find a common accepted definition of the word and of the actual meaning of representation (who was entitled to represent whom and what had to be done when representatives disregarded those whom they were supposed to represent) was by no means an easy task to accomplish. Much ink and blood was spilled. The representative model of democracy as we know it is for Keane the result of many and different power conflicts, many of them bitterly fought in opposition to ruling groups, whether they were church hierarchies, landowners or imperial monarchies, often in the name of "the people". The concept of the sovereign "people" was one of the most contested in this second phase.

=== The Monitory Model ===
The third part of the book is dedicated to the evolution of democracy since 1945. In Keane's view, after World War II, democracy has entered a new phase, which he calls Monitory democracy. He explains that during the first half of the twentieth century, the Representative model faced its deepest crisis. Parliaments proved to be not strong enough to defend democracy from economic collapse and the rise of various forms of dictatorial and totalitarian rule. The system of representative democracy based purely on representation showed its limits and fragility; the use of mass communication media (the press, the radio, and cinema) helped populist leaders like Mussolini and Hitler to gain consensus and almost destroy democracy as it had been hitherto known. The crisis in fact culminated in total war (1939–1945) and 'near-destruction worldwide of democratic institutions and ways of life by the storms of mechanized war, dictatorship and totalitarian rule'.

After World War II, alongside parliamentary politics (typical of the representative model), "many different kinds of extra-parliamentary, power-scrutinising mechanisms" emerged. Keane calls these mechanisms "monitory bodies"; they function both from within the state and cross-borders. The emergence of monitory bodies have transformative effects on the core institutions of representative democracy: nation states are still important, but power-holders (representatives) are subject increasingly to unprecedented scrutiny from within and across borders, and outside the conventional mechanism of periodic elections and parliamentary representation.

Some examples of these extra-parliamentary power-monitoring institutions include public integrity commissions, judicial activism, local courts, workplace tribunals, consensus conferences, parliaments for minorities, public interest litigation, citizens' juries, citizens' assemblies, independent public inquiries, think-tanks, experts' reports, participatory budgeting, vigils, 'blogging' and other novel forms of media scrutiny.

Historically speaking, due to its intricate network of institutions and inner dynamics, Keane considers Monitory democracy to be the most complex form of democracy ever. He emphasizes that its fruitful evolution is not to be taken for granted. Democracy is in a continuous state of flux. According to the book, democracy is not a done deal or something accomplished but still an unfinished experiment that "thrives on imperfection".

== Reception ==
Since its first publication in Britain in June 2009 the book has been reviewed by some of the major newspapers and reviews worldwide.

- 'Publishers Weekly' wrote Keane's "study's broad sweep, wealth of detailed knowledge, shrewd insights and fluent, lively prose make it a must-read for scholars and citizens alike"
- The Times of London columnist David Aaronovitch wrote that in May 2009 referring to the bewildering weeks in the recent history of British democracy, namely, the expense claims scandal surrounding Westminster: "What a difference a book can make. I had been as confused as any other observers about these events... Respectable women call BBC Radio 4 programmes to talk about how they would like to "string up" their elected representatives; headlines and commentators seem to compete for the most apocalyptic way of describing a crisis in governance ... How to make sense of all this? I was "thrashing around attempting to catch their meaning - and then I read John Keane's The Life and Death of Democracy …. Contained in this massive book was, among many, many other things, the analytical tool that told me why such a period as we have been living through was more or less inevitable."
- In summer 2009, The Life and Death of Democracy was selected by the Times among the best history books for 'your holiday reading'. The London paper called the book 'the publishing event of the summer'
- The Daily Telegraph ranked The Life and Death of Democracy alongside must-take holiday items, like women's electric shavers.
- Ben Wilson from the pages of the Literary Review wrote: "It has become something of a fashion to write 'biographies' of inanimate things and ideas: fighter planes, football clubs, numbers, scientific theories, and so on. Despite its title, this is no such thing; rather, it is about the lives and deaths of many different forms of human government, sometimes within very short time periods. Keane's approach is evident from the beginning of this impressive work. […] Keane experiments with a number of voices, from the polemical to the analytical, and from ironic detachment to involved, lyrical narratives. There are jokes, and in one chapter he takes the guise of a future female historian writing of the first decade of the twenty-first century. His aim is to carry the reader through a long and sometimes complex history, and I think he succeeds."
- David Runciman from The Observer writes that Keane's book "is a remarkable book, nearly 1,000 pages long and with something to be learnt from almost every one of them. Still," Runcimans adds "it's longer than it needs to be. Keane has travelled widely and thought deeply about his subject, but his repeated insistence on the originality of what he's doing starts to grate after a while."
- Sunil Khilnani from the Financial Times wrote that "Keane successfully expands our sense of democracy's origins, deftly traces its global reach, and rightly insists on the contingent, historical character of democracy, its emergence and evolution through unintended moves that have enabled its continual reinvention. So sweeping a study must necessarily stand on others' shoulders but here Keane is slack. He fails to provide adequate footnotes for ideas, specific examples and phrases."
- In August Keane's book featured among the books recommended by the Daily Beast, the news reporting and opinion website published by Tina Brown, former editor of Vanity Fair and The New Yorker
- Stephen Barber's (Social Europe Journal, August 2009) wrote: "This is an extraordinary book which tells us almost as much about the future of our democracy as it does about the past and the present. It shows us how fragile is democracy and reminds us that, despite its recent shortcomings, we rather like democracy and rather take it for granted."
- Paul Pickering from the pages of the Sydney Morning Herald wrote: "this is ambitious study charts the rise of a political system and ponders its future. A product of a decade of research and writing, this is a work of enduring importance".
- Brenton Holmes from the Canberra Times wrote: If democracies and their defenders are "sleepwalking their way into deep trouble", John Keane's latest tome The Life and Death of Democracy delivers the kind of slap that should rouse even the most comatose of them. Or more likely, it would concuss them. Coming in at just under a thousand pages, it is not a book for the faint-hearted. Nor is it a book to be shelved until one has a month free to wade through it. Reading it feels more like surfing than wading, with all the associated plunging and soaring — and the occasional wipe-out.
- Sanford Levinson for the History Book Club wrote: John Keane has written an astounding, truly audacious, book. Indeed, it may be the first attempt at a comprehensive survey of "democracy" in well over a century. To describe it as "comprehensive" is no idle gesture. One reason for its 1000-page length is that he has illuminating discussions of societies ranging across time and space from the ancient Near East and Athens—one of his important theses is that we overestimate the "invention of democracy" by Athens by ignoring evidence of the significance of "assemblies" in the Near East well before the Greeks—to contemporary developments in Asia, Africa and Latin America as well as more predictable discussions of Europe and North America.

In June and July 2009 the book occupied the top spot in Amazon's bestseller list for books on democracy in 'Political Science & Ideology' section and in the History section.

== As a source ==
The Life and Death of Democracy provided the key source material for the opening timeline (2500 BCE to 1770 CE) featured at the new Museum of Australian Democracy. Located in the Old Parliament House, in the capital city of Canberra, the museum was officially opened on 9 May 2009 by the former Australian Prime Minister, the Hon R.J.L. Hawke AC.
