= William I. Robinson =

American sociology professor

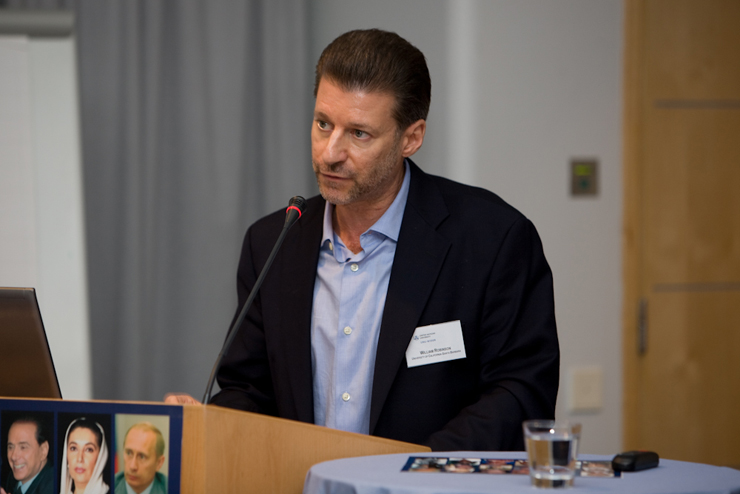
Robinson in 2009

William I. Robinson (born March 28, 1959) is an American professor of sociology at the University of California, Santa Barbara. His work focuses on political sociology, globalization, Latin America, social change, and historical materialism. He is a member of the International Parliamentary and Civil Society Mission to Investigate the Political Transition in Iraq.

== Early life ==
In the early 1980s Robinson worked as a journalist in war-torn Nicaragua. He was a member of Union of Nicaraguan Journalists (past member and officer 1984–1990). Robinson then went on to study for his BA in Journalism with the Friends World College in Nairobi (Kenya), Ibadan (Nigeria), and Costa Rica. Following this he received both his MA in Latin American Studies and his PhD in Sociology at the University of New Mexico.

== Academic work ==
Throughout his career as an academic, Robinson has written multiple books, academic journals, and chapters within books authored by others. He has made several contributions to media outlets including the BBC, The Guardian, La Jornada, Al Jazeera, and ZNetwork. His works have been translated into many languages including Spanish, Chinese, Japanese, and Arabic.

== Theoretical debates ==
Entire symposiums and issues of scholarly journals have focused on discussing and debating Robinson's theories on global capitalism, class, and political economy including the April 2001 issue of Theory and Society, the debate between Robinson and noted Marxian theorist Ellen Meiksins Wood in issue 15 of the journal Historical Materialism, the debate between British political economist in the 2009 volume 1(2) of the journal of the contemporary science association.

== Works ==
=== Books ===
- Robinson, William I.; Norsworthy, Kent (1987). David and Goliath: the U. S. War Against Nicaragua. New York, N.Y.: Monthly Review Press. ISBN 0-85345-721-2.
- Robinson, William I. (1992). A Faustian Bargain: U. S. Intervention in the Nicaraguan Elections and American Foreign Policy in the post-Cold War Era. Boulder: Westview Press. ISBN 0-8133-8233-5.
- Robinson, William I. (1996). Promoting Polyarchy: Globalization, US Intervention, and Hegemony. Cambridge [England]: Cambridge University Press. ISBN 0-521-56691-6.
- Burbach, Roger; Robinson, William; Jeffries, Fiona Margaret (2001). Globalization and Postmodern Politics: from Zapatistas to High Tech Robber Barons. London: Pluto Press. ISBN 0-7453-1649-2.
- Robinson, William I. (2003). Transnational Conflicts: Central America, Social Change and Globalization. London: Verso. ISBN 1-85984-547-9.
- Robinson, William I. (2004). A Theory of Global Capitalism: Transnational Production, Transnational Capitalists, and the Transnational State. Baltimore: Johns Hopkins University Press. ISBN 978-0-8018-7927-2.
- Robinson, William I.; Appelbaum, Richard P. (2005). Critical globalization studies. New York: Routledge. ISBN 0-415-94961-0.
- Robinson, William I. (2008). Latin America and Global Capitalism: A Critical Globalization Perspective (Johns Hopkins Studies in Globalization). The Johns Hopkins University Press. ISBN 978-0-8018-9039-0.
- Robinson, William I. (2014). Global capitalism and the crisis of humanity. New York City: Cambridge University Press. ISBN 978-1-107-06747-9.
- Robinson, William I.; Griffin, Maryam Susan, eds. (2017). We will not be silenced: the academic repression of Israel's critics. Chico, CA: AK Press. ISBN 978-1-84935-277-2.
- Robinson, William I. (2014). Global capitalism and the crisis of humanity. New York City: Cambridge University Press. ISBN 978-1-107-06747-9.
- Robinson, William I. (2019). Faustian Bargain: U. S. Intervention in the Nicaraguan Elections and American Foreign Policy in the Post-Cold War Era. Taylor & Francis Group. ISBN 978-0429722608.
- Robinson, William I. (2019). Into the Tempest: Essays on the New Global Capitalism. La Vergne: Haymarket Books. ISBN 978-1-60846-966-6.
- Robinson, William I. (2020). The global police state. London: Pluto Press. ISBN 978-1786806666.
- Robinson, William I. (April 13, 2021). El capitalismo global y la crisis de la humanidad (Spanish ed.). Siglo XXI Editores México. ISBN 978-6070311291.
- Robinson, William I. (2022). Global civil war: capitalism post-pandemic. Oakland, CA: Kairos PM Press. ISBN 978-1629639536.
- Robinson, William I. (2022). Can global capitalism endure? (First ed.). Atlanta: Clarity Press, Inc. ISBN 978-1949762563.
- Robinson, William I. (2024). War, global capitalism and resistance. London: Resistance Books. ISBN 978-1872242224.
- Robinson, William I. (2025). Epochal crisis: the exhaustion of global capitalism. Cambridge New York Port Melbourne New Delhi Singapore: Cambridge University Press. ISBN 978-1-009-67049-4.
- Barrera, Mario; Torres, Rodolfo D.; Robinson, William I. (2026). Race and Class in the Southwest and Other Essays: Studies in Political Economy. New York: Routledge. ISBN 978-1032982878.
