= Alan Hirsch (professor) =

American political scientist (born 1959)

- Born: 1959 (age 66–67)
- Occupations: Justice & Law Studies Professor, Expert Witness & Trial Consultant
- Spouse: Marjorie Hirsch

Academic background
- Education: Yale University (J.D.); Amherst College (B.A.)
- Website: truthaboutfalseconfessions.com

Alan L. Hirsch (born 1959) is an American political scientist who has taught at Williams College since 2006, and has chaired the Justice and Law Studies program for most of that time. Hirsch, who received his BA from Amherst College and JD at Yale Law School, serves as a trial consultant and expert witness in false confessions. He has been retained in roughly 400 cases and testified in 50. Hirsch testified in the highly publicized case of Skylar Richardson, a teenage girl accused of killing her newborn baby and burying it in her backyard. Richardson was acquitted.

He has written extensively about false confessions, and been qualified as an expert in 24 jurisdictions. He created the first website devoted to the subject and also created a podcast about False Confessions. Hirsch has also written numerous books, as well as scholarly and mainstream articles on other subjects, some law-related and others about politics, sports, and miscellaneous matters.

== Career ==
After graduating from Yale Law School in 1985, Hirsch served as a law clerk for Judge Edward Becker on the United States Court of Appeals for the Third Circuit in Philadelphia. He later spent three years as a Senior Attorney/Writer at the Federal Judicial Center in Washington, D.C. Ever since, he has been primarily a writer, professor, and trial consultant. He also worked as a senior consultant at UCLA School of Law's Williams Project on Sexual Orientation Law and Public Policy.

== Works ==
- So Misunderstood: The Alt-Key Experiment and Internalized False Confessions Champion (2022)
- On A Close Reid: Using the Reid Method to Suppress Confessions Champion (2020)
- Going to the Source: the 'New' Reid Method and False Confessions Ohio State Criminal Law Journal (Spring 2014)
- Not Coming Clean: Common Police Practices Won't Cure Tainted Terrorist Confessions Legal Times (February 18, 2008)
- Confessions and Harmless Error: A New Argument for the Old Approach Boalt Journal of Criminal Law (Spring 2007)
- Why the Innocent Confess Los Angeles Times (April 25, 2006)
- Threats, Promises, and False Confessions: Lessons of Slavery Howard Law Journal (Winter 2005)
- The Tragedy of False Confessions (and a Modest Proposal) North Dakota Law Review (Fall 2005)
- A Short History of Presidential Election Crises (And How to Prevent the Next One) (City Lights Publishers, 2020) ISBN 9780872868298
- Impeaching the President (City Lights Publishers, 2018) ISBN 9780872867628
- The Duke of Wellington, Kidnapped!: The Incredible True Story of the Art Heist that Shocked a Nation (Counterpoint, 2016) ISBN 978-1619029521
- Awarding Attorneys' Fees and Managing Fee Litigation (Federal Judicial Center, 2005)
- For The People: What the Constitution Really Says About Your Rights (Free Press, 1998, co-authored with Akhil Reed Amar) ISBN 978-0684871028
- Verdict: Assessing the Civil Jury System (contributor, 1993) ISBN 978-0815752813
- Talking Heads: Political Talk Shows and Their Star Pundits (St. Martin's, 1991) ISBN 978-0312055219
