= Democratic deficit =

When an institution falls short of upholding the people's power in and over itself

A democratic deficit (or democracy deficit) occurs when ostensibly-democratic organizations or institutions (particularly governments) fall short of fulfilling the principles of democracy in their practices or operation. Representative and linked parliamentary integrity have become widely discussed. The qualitative expression of the democratic deficit is the difference between the democracy indices of a country from the highest possible values.

== Etymology ==
The phrase "democratic deficit" is cited as first being used by the Young European Federalists in their Manifesto in 1977, which was drafted by Richard Corbett. It was also used by David Marquand in 1979, referring to the European Economic Community, the forerunner of the European Union.

== Voting rights ==
The term "democratic deficit" is commonly used to refer to situations where territories under the jurisdiction of a sovereign state do not enjoy equal participation in electing representatives that legislate for them. Examples include:

- Australia: Three external territories of Australia (Christmas Island, Cocos (Keeling) Islands and Norfolk Island), have laws from the states of Western Australia or New South Wales apply to them but cannot vote in the elections of those states.
- Netherlands: Three constituent countries of the Kingdom of the Netherlands (Aruba, Curacao and Sint Maarten) have no representation in the States General of the Netherlands.
- United Kingdom: Eleven inhabited British Overseas Territories and three Crown Dependencies (Guernsey, Jersey and the Isle of Man) have no representation in the Parliament of the United Kingdom.
- United States: The District of Columbia and five inhabited territories of the United States (Puerto Rico, Guam, Northern Mariana Islands, American Samoa and U.S. Virgin Islands), only have non-voting representation in the United States House of Representatives, and none in the United States Senate.

Tokelau, a dependent territory of New Zealand with no representation in the New Zealand Parliament, could also be said to be in a similar position. However, in practice, no legislation from New Zealand is extended to Tokelau without the territory's consent.

== Multinational organizations ==
Some scholars have argued that the ratification of European Union treaties by repeated referendums, such as those held in Ireland for the Treaty of Nice and the Treaty of Lisbon, is also associated with a democratic deficit. National parliaments have given up power to the centralised European Parliament. As European Union citizens elect those who make up Council who then elect those become that Commissioners, there is a real fear it is too distant for many citizens. Often, EU elections are treated as second-order elections; with protest votes more common during national and local elections, example of this would be the success of anti-immigration parties such as Europe of Freedom and Direct Democracy. Another problem in the EU is that voters vote more on the basis of national issues in the European Parliament elections and that the election is more used by voters to punish their government in the middle of their term. There is also insufficiently a European public opinion or European public sphere that votes against or rewards European politicians. Another problem is the big influence of lobbying groups on European institutions. The European Parliament was created to give more democratic legitimacy to the EU but shares legislative power with the Council of the European Union, which has one vote per country.

The UN Parliamentary Assembly has been proposed as a way of ameliorating a democratic deficit within the United Nations.

== Other examples ==
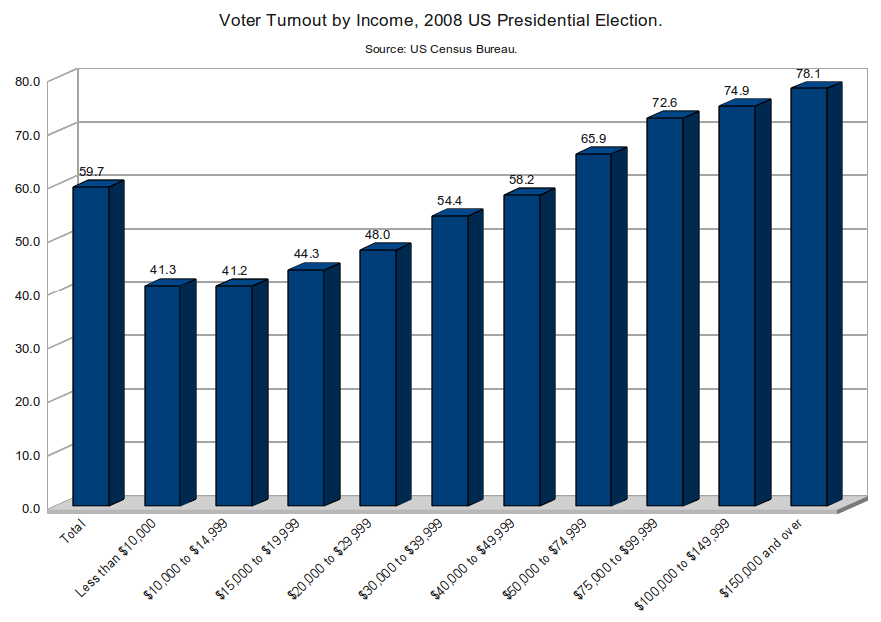
Voter turnout at the American presidential elections of 2008 according to income

A study of the Columbia University concluded that policy in US states is congruent with the majority only half the time. The largest influences were found to be legislative professionalization, term limits, and issue salience. Partisanship and interest groups affect the ideological balance of incongruence more than the aggregate degree thereof. Policy is found to be overresponsive to ideology and party, which leads policy to be polarized relative to state electorates. The large differences in voter turnout during US elections for various income groups are also seen as a problem for the functioning of democracy. Sanford Levinson argues that campaign financing and gerrymandering are seen as serious problems for democracy, but another of the root causes of the American democratic deficit lies in the US Constitution itself. For example, there is a lack of representation in the US Senate for highly populated states such as California as all states in the United States regardless of population receive 2 seats in the Senate.

During the 2003 Liberal Party of Canada leadership election, Liberal leadership contender, Paul Martin used this term as a way to point out that lawmakers in Canada are restricted by the Prime Minister Office to perform their duties. To address it, he suggested by allowing freer votes, introducing an independent ethics commissioner, increasing the number of independent parliamentary committees and renewing the system for private members' bills.

== See also ==
- Defective democracy
- Democratic legitimacy of the European Union
- Direct democracy
- Elite theory
- Freedom deficit
- How Democratic Is the American Constitution?
- Political apathy
- Political polarization
- Popular assembly
- Post-democracy
