= Freedom deficit =

Freedom deficit is a term coined by a group of Arab scholars for the UNDP Arab Human Development Report in 2002. As defined in the report, a freedom deficit exists when there is "a substantial lag between Arab countries and other regions in terms of participatory government," where "freedom" is thus synonymous with "democracy."

== Description of the concept ==
A measure of the freedom deficit is calculated by assessing political participation and accountability, freedom of expression and political corruption. The 2002 Arab Human Development Report attempted to account for the fact that the Arab region does poorly on the Human Development Index, yet does not suffer the same economic woes of similar nations. These scholars posited three deficits: freedom, women's empowerment, and knowledge.

Since 2002, the term has been used by politicians and pundits alike. Shortly after the 2003 invasion of Iraq, US Defense undersecretary Douglas J. Feith noted that once free of Saddam Hussein, Iraq would no longer suffer from a freedom deficit. US President George W. Bush acknowledged the role of Western nations in contributing to the freedom deficit in the Middle East. The conservative American Enterprise Institute issued a commentary in 2004 defending the war on terrorism as being crucial to ending the freedom deficit. United States Secretary of State Condoleezza Rice used the term in December 2006 during a press conference on the Israeli–Palestinian conflict to describe the "core problem" of the Middle East.

Beyond the Middle East, libertarian blogger John Pugsley applied the term to China, noting that the US/China trade deficit is really a result of a freedom deficit in China.

== See also ==
- Democratic deficit
