= David K. Cohen =

American educational theorist (1934–2020)

David K. Cohen (August 16, 1934 – September 23, 2020) was an American educational theorist.

Between 1964 and 1966, Cohen was a consultant to the NAACP. He then served as director of the Race and Education Project, an initiative of the United States Commission on Civil Rights. Cohen joined the Harvard Graduate School of Education in 1968 as a lecturer. The next year, he was named an associate professor, and promoted to full professor in 1971. Cohen retired from Harvard University in 1986. During his time at Harvard, Cohen served concurrently as president of the Huron Institute. He taught at Michigan State University between 1986 and 1993, as the John Hannah Chair within the Department of Education. Cohen subsequently moved to the University of Michigan, where he was named the John Dewey Collegiate Professor of Education and jointly held a professorship in public policy at the Gerald R. Ford School of Public Policy. Cohen was a member of the first board of directors convened by the Albert Shanker Institute, and remained in that position for twenty years. He was elected a member of the American Academy of Arts and Sciences in 2013.
