= Anticipatory exclusion =

Anticipatory exclusion refers to a citizen's decision not to attend a discussion due to the anticipation of being excluded. The citizen would never take part in a discussion because they believe that their views and perspectives wouldn't be given equal time or consideration, when compared to dominant views. In other words, the (often realistic) fear of being excluded, discounted, or dismissed causes a person to decline an opportunity to attend a public event. Calling this "exclusion" implies that the individual's personal decision not to participate actually reflects a larger historical pattern of active exclusion toward similar individuals.

== Causes ==
Anticipatory exclusion is often caused by internal exclusion, which is the way certain dominant ideas and social perspectives can control a discussion even when participants have diverse perspectives (Fung 2004, p. 49). In contrast, external exclusion refers to the fact that minority viewpoints are rarely heard due to structural inequalities in a community (Fung, 2004).

== Background ==
It is generally associated with Dahl's criteria for a democratic process, inclusion and effective participation, which many political theorists consider essential for a participatory or deliberative democracy (Dahl, 1989). Many democratic theorists attempt to solve the challenge of anticipatory and other types of exclusion through formal equalization mechanisms, including structural and economic reforms that would guarantee all citizens have adequate time, education, and resources to deliberate (Sanders 1997, p. 7). But even when these inequalities are adjusted for Sanders argues that deliberative institutions might cater to and perpetuate inequalities against historically disenfranchised groups (e.g., women, minorities) (see also, Schattan, Coelho, Pozzoni, Montoya 2005).

== See also ==
- Deliberative democracy
- Simple majority
