= Governance Without Government =

1992 book edited by Rosenau and Czempiel

- Editors: James N. Rosenau and Ernst-Otto Czempiel
- Subject: International relations
- Publisher: Cambridge University Press
- Publication date: 1992
- Pages: 311

Governance Without Government: Order and Change in World Politics is a 1992 international relations book edited by James N. Rosenau and Ernst-Otto Czempiel about how world order and institutions work in interdependent, cooperative relationships rather than central governance.

== See also ==
- Global governance
