= How Democratic Is the American Constitution? =

2001 book by Robert A. Dahl

- Author: Robert A. Dahl
- Language: English
- Genre: Non-fiction
- Publication date: 2001
- Publication place: United States
- ISBN: 0-300-09218-0

How Democratic is the American Constitution? is a 2001 book by American political scientist Robert A. Dahl that discusses seven undemocratic elements of the United States Constitution. A second edition was published in 2003.

The book defines "democratic" as alignment with the principle of one person, one vote, also known as majority rule. It praises the Framers of the Constitution as "men of exceptional talent and virtue" (p. 7) who made admirable progress in the creation of their republican government. However, it also points out that innovation and change in democratic techniques and ideals continued even after the Constitution had been codified, and the American system has not adopted all of those new ideas. He notes that the Founding Founders were partially constrained by public opinion, which included maintenance of the sovereignty of the thirteen states.

According to Alan Gibson, who reviewed the book in The Review of Politics, the book consists of five core arguments:

1. "the constitution is an undemocratic, anomalous relic";
2. "the Constitution [...] contains no unified theory of democracy or government";
3. "the performance of the American government is 'something less than impressive' when compared to constitutional systems in [...] other democratic nations";
4. "political equality" does necessarily not "[threaten] individual rights"; and
5. many opportunities for reform exist, which Dahl outlines.

== Undemocratic elements ==
The primary undemocratic aspects of the Constitution that the book sets out are:

- Tolerance of slavery – Necessary to ensure the co-operation and the participation of the Southern states, it was outlawed only after the American Civil War
- Suffrage – The voting rights of women, African-Americans, and Native Americans were not protected or specifically abridged. (In 1870, the Fifteenth Amendment prohibited the denial of suffrage by race. In 1920, the Nineteenth Amendment prohibited the denial of suffrage by sex. In 1964, the Twenty-Fourth Amendment prohibited poll taxes, which were used in some states to discriminate against African-Americans without explicit racial provisions.)
- Election of the president – Article II Section 1 establishes the Electoral College, which gives each state a number of electors proportional to its representation in Congress, which, because each state has two senators, is not proportional to population. Electors were to be appointed by whatever method the state legislatures chose, and they would presumably use their own judgment in choosing a president. This aspect identified by Dahl continues to be applicable in modern times, as all U.S. states except Nebraska and Maine use a "winner-takes-all" system to allocate the votes of their electors based on the outcome of the popular vote within that state, but the allocation of votes among the states has been unchanged.
- Representation in the Senate – Each state gets two senators, regardless of population. That is known as the Connecticut Compromise and was incorporated into the Constitution to secure the continued participation of the smaller states. (The book also references Sizing Up the Senate by Frances Lee and Bruce Oppenheimer.)
- Election of senators – Article I, Section 3 declared that senators were to be appointed directly by state legislatures. In 1913, the Seventeenth Amendment changed the system so that senators were popularly elected in staggered statewide races.
- Judicial power – In the United States, judges have the power to rule unconstitutional any law or regulation, even if it was duly approved by the legislature and signed by the President. Judges are appointed (not elected) for life with a high threshold for removal, which makes them independent. Dahl feels that the judiciary has used its rather-unconstrained authority to engage in judicial legislation.
- Limitations on congressional power – The US Constitution reserves sovereignty in many domains of regulation to the states, the powers of the US Congress are limited to a specific list. Dahl argues restrictions on congressional powers has prevented the federal government from exercising regulatory power such as controlling the economy through means adopted by other modern democratic governments. The expansion of congress's power has required amendments such as the Sixteenth Amendment, ratified in 1913, gave Congress the power to enact income taxes.

== What kind of constitution is best? ==
Dahl considers the question of whether the details of the US Constitution, as amended and practiced in modern times, are superior or inferior to the constitutional systems of other stable democracies. His criteria for evaluation are:

- Political stability (that is, remaining democratic)
- Effective protection of democratic rights
- Democratic fairness
- Fosters consensus-building
- Promotes effective problem solving

=== Maintaining stability ===
Dahl supposes that there are certain conditions that make it easier to maintain a democracy in a given country. He writes that they seem to include "the effective control by elected leaders over the military and police, a political culture supportive of democratic beliefs, and a relatively well-functioning economic order, among others."

Dahl proposes that highly-unfavorable circumstances cause instability, no matter the constitutional systems. Under highly-favorable circumstances, a country may remain democratic in a range of possible constitutional arrangements, whether or not the system is the best kind for promoting stability. In mixed conditions, he postulates, the details of a country's constitution may tip the balance between stability and undesirable changes, such as the conversion to dictatorship.

Dahl points out that the superiority of presidential vs. parliamentary systems in this regard is disputed and that correlation between breakdown and presidential systems in the "Third World" may not be indicative of a causal relationship. He seems to take the position that different systems may be better suited to the peculiar circumstances of different countries. (p. 96)

In favor of parliamentary systems, he cites: Juan Linz and Arturo Valenzuela, eds., The Failure of Presidential Democracy: Comparative Perspectives, vol. 1. Johns Hopkins University Press, 1994. In favor of presidential systems, he cites: Matthew Soberg Shugart and John M. Carey, Presidents and Assemblies: Constitutional Design and Electoral Dynamics. Cambridge University Press, 1992. p. 41-42.

Dahl notes that instability is more common in new democracies:

In the twentieth century, on something like seventy occasions democracies have given way to nondemocratic regimes. Yet with very few exceptions, these breakdowns have occurred in countries where democratic institutions were very new -- less than a generation old. Indeed, the only clear-cut case of a democratic breakdown in a country where democratic institutions had existed for twenty years or more seems to be Uruguay in 1973. In the same year, Chile provided a less clear-cut case because of restrictions on the suffrage that had only recently been lifted. The Weimar Republic had existed fewer than fourteen years before the Nazi takeover.

— p. 134-135

=== International comparisons ===
Dahl finds meaningful comparisons to the US Constitution only in other countries with similar conditions. He says that only 22 countries, including the United States, have been "steadily democratic" since 1950. His book identifies the following constitutional attributes as important for comparison:

- Federalism. Is the country a federal union of strong local governments (for example, states, provinces, cantons), or a unitary state? In order to be federal, the subordinate units must be protected by constitutional law or practice, have substantial autonomy, and have substantial power to pass legislation.
- Bicameralism. Are there two houses in the legislature, both with substantial powers?
- "Unequal" representation in upper house. Are votes in one house of the legislature allocated by governmental subunit (for example, state, province, canton), not by population?
- Strong judicial review of national legislation: The power to declare unconstitutional laws duly passed by parliament and/or signed by the president. (That is distinct from the ability to strike down acts of subordinate governments, such as states or provinces.)
- Electoral system
  - Single-Member District Plurality, also known as first-past-the-Post (FPTP). There is one seat per district, and the candidate with the most votes (a plurality) wins.
  - Proportional Representation (the fairest electoral system). There are multiple seats for each voting district. They are divided up in one of several ways based on the proportion of the vote that individual candidates or political parties receive.
    - Party lists
    - Multi-member proportional (MMP)
    - Single Transferable Vote (STV)
    - Semi-PR
  - French two-round system.
  - Alternative vote (AV)
- Political parties
  - Two-party system. Two dominant parties control the executive and the vast majority of seats in the legislature.
  - Multi-party system. Three or more political parties exert significant influence in the legislature.
- Overall structure. Is there a presidential system with a strong separation of powers between the executive and the legislature, or is there a parliamentary system?

=== List of countries steadily democratic since at least 1950 ===
The book compares the 23 stable, wealthy democracies on these criteria, summarized as follows:

List of countries steadily democratic since at least 1950
Country	Strongly federal?	Strongly bicameral?	Upper house with unequal repress.?	Strong judicial review?	Electoral system	Party system	Structure
Australia	Yes	Yes	Yes	Yes	Lower House AV; Upper House PR (STV)	Multi	Parliamentary
Austria	Yes	No	No	No	PR (list)	Multi	Parliamentary
Belgium	Yes (since 1993)	No	No	No	PR (list)	Multi	Parliamentary
Canada	Yes	No	Yes	Yes	FPTP	Multi	Parliamentary
Costa Rica	No	No	No	No	PR (list)	Multi	Presidential
Denmark	No	No	No	No	PR (list)	Multi	Parliamentary
Finland	No	No	No	No	PR (list)	Multi	Parliamentary
France	No	No	No	No	2 round	Multi	Parliamentary
Germany	Yes	Yes	Yes	Yes	PR (MMP)	Multi	Parliamentary
India	Yes	Yes	No	Yes	FPTP	Multi	Parliamentary
Iceland	No	No	No	No	PR (list)	Multi	Parliamentary
Ireland	No	No	No	No	PR (STV)	Multi	Parliamentary
Israel	No	No	No	No	PR (list)	Multi	Parliamentary
Italy	No	Yes	No	No	PR (MMP)	Multi	Parliamentary
Japan	No	No	No	No	Semi-PR	Multi	Parliamentary
Luxembourg	No	No	No	No	PR (list)	Multi	Parliamentary
Netherlands	No	Yes	No	No	PR (list)	Multi	Parliamentary
New Zealand	No	No	No	No	PR (MMP)	Multi	Parliamentary
Norway	No	No	No	No	PR (list)	Multi	Parliamentary
Sweden	No	No	No	No	PR (list)	Multi	Parliamentary
Switzerland	Yes	Yes	Yes	No	PR (list)	Multi	Parliamentary
United Kingdom	No	No	No	No	FPTP	Multi	Parliamentary
United States	Yes	Yes	Yes	Yes	FPTP	Two	Presidential
Totals	Yes:8, No:15	Yes:7, No:16	Yes:5, No:18	Yes:5; No:20	FPTP:3, PR-list:13, PR-AV:1, 2-round:1 PR-MMP:3, PR:STV:1 Semi-PR:1	Two:1, Multi:22	Presidential:2, Parliamentary:21
Source: R. Dahl (2000), How Democratic Is the American Constitution? - Table 1

=== Protecting democratic rights ===
Looking at Freedom House rankings, Dahl concludes that there is no discernible correlation between the seven constitutional features and ratings on political rights or civil rights among the 23 comparison countries.

=== Fairness and consensus ===
Dahl contrasts majoritarian governments, whose electoral system (such as first-past-the-post) can grant a dominant group (or even a minority group) decisive control over the government, with proportional systems, which make governmental control is more distributed. He concludes that proportional systems are more fair.

Proportional systems also do more to promote consensus-building, he claims, because of the need to build coalitions to form a majority.

Dahl considers the American system to be a hybrid because of its bicameral legislature and strong separation of powers, and the strong executive, which he says does not fit the mold of either category.

=== Problem-solving effectiveness ===
Data from Patterns of Democracy (Yale University Press, 1999) by Arend Lijphart is presented in an appendix, which ranks the U.S. on a best-to-worst scale among a varying number of countries. Ranked criteria include economic growth, unemployment, inflation, economic inequality, women's representation, energy efficiency, incarceration rates, social spending, voter turnout, and foreign aid. Not all analysts would agree; with Dahl that all of the criteria are appropriate measures of government effectiveness, and in some cases, there are political disagreements on whether a given indicator should be higher or lower. In the rankings that are given, the United States is in the best third of one, the middle third of six, and the bottom third of eight.

Dahl states that difference in size, diversity, and economic affluence make attributing good performance on those measures to government effectiveness too difficult. He describes American performance as "mediocre" and concludes that changing the US Constitution to a system resembling one of the other stable democracies would not necessarily negatively impact government performance.

== See also ==
- Democratic deficit
- Reform of the Senate
