= Scandinavian Political Studies =

- Discipline: Political science
- Language: English
- Edited by: Maximilian Conrad; Silja Bára R. Ómarsdóttir; Stefanía Óskarsdóttir

Publication details
- History: 1966–present
- Publisher: Wiley-Blackwell (United Kingdom)
- Frequency: Quarterly
- Impact factor: 1.114 (2014)

Standard abbreviations
- ISO 4: Scand. Political Stud.

Indexing
- ISSN: 0080-6757 (print); 1467-9477 (web)
- LCCN: 66031734
- OCLC no.: 41954110

Links
- Journal homepage; Online access; Online archive; Public Knowledge Project (PKP) archive

Scandinavian Political Studies is a quarterly peer-reviewed academic journal covering political science in the Nordic countries published by Wiley-Blackwell. The current joint editors-in-chief are Maximilian Conrad (University of Iceland), Silja Bára R. Ómarsdóttir (University of Iceland), and Stefanía Óskarsdóttir (University of Iceland).

== Abstracting and indexing ==
The journal is abstracted and indexed in:

- Academic Search
- Academic Search Alumni Edition
- Academic Search Premier
- America: History & Life
- CSA Biological Sciences Database
- CSA Environmental Sciences & Pollution Management Database
- Current Contents/Social & Behavioural Sciences
- Ecology Abstracts
- Environment Index
- Historical Abstracts
- International Bibliography of Book Reviews (IBR)
- International Bibliography of Periodical Literature (IBZ)
- International Bibliography of the Social Sciences (IBSS)
- International Political Science Abstracts
- Journal Citation Reports/Social Sciences Edition
- SCOPUS
- Social Sciences Citation Index
- Social Services Abstracts
- Sociological Abstracts
- Sociological Collection
- Worldwide Political Science Abstracts

According to the Journal Citation Reports, the journal has a 2014 impact factor of 1.114, ranking it 50th out of 161 journals in the category "Political Science".

== See also ==
- List of political science journals
