= Upper class =

Social class

Upper class in modern societies is the social class composed of people who hold the highest social status. Usually, these are the wealthiest members of class society, and wield the greatest political power. According to this view, the upper class is generally distinguished by immense wealth which is passed on from generation to generation. Prior to the 20th century, the emphasis was on aristocracy, which emphasized generations of inherited noble status, not just recent wealth.

Because the upper classes of a society may no longer rule the society in which they are living, they are often referred to as the old upper classes, and they are often culturally distinct from the newly rich middle classes that tend to dominate public life in modern social democracies. According to the latter view held by the traditional upper classes, no amount of individual wealth or fame would make a person from an undistinguished background into a member of the upper class as one must be born into a family of that class and raised in a particular manner to understand and share upper class values, traditions, and cultural norms. The term is often used in conjunction with terms like upper-middle class, middle class, and working class as part of a model of social stratification.

== Historical meaning ==
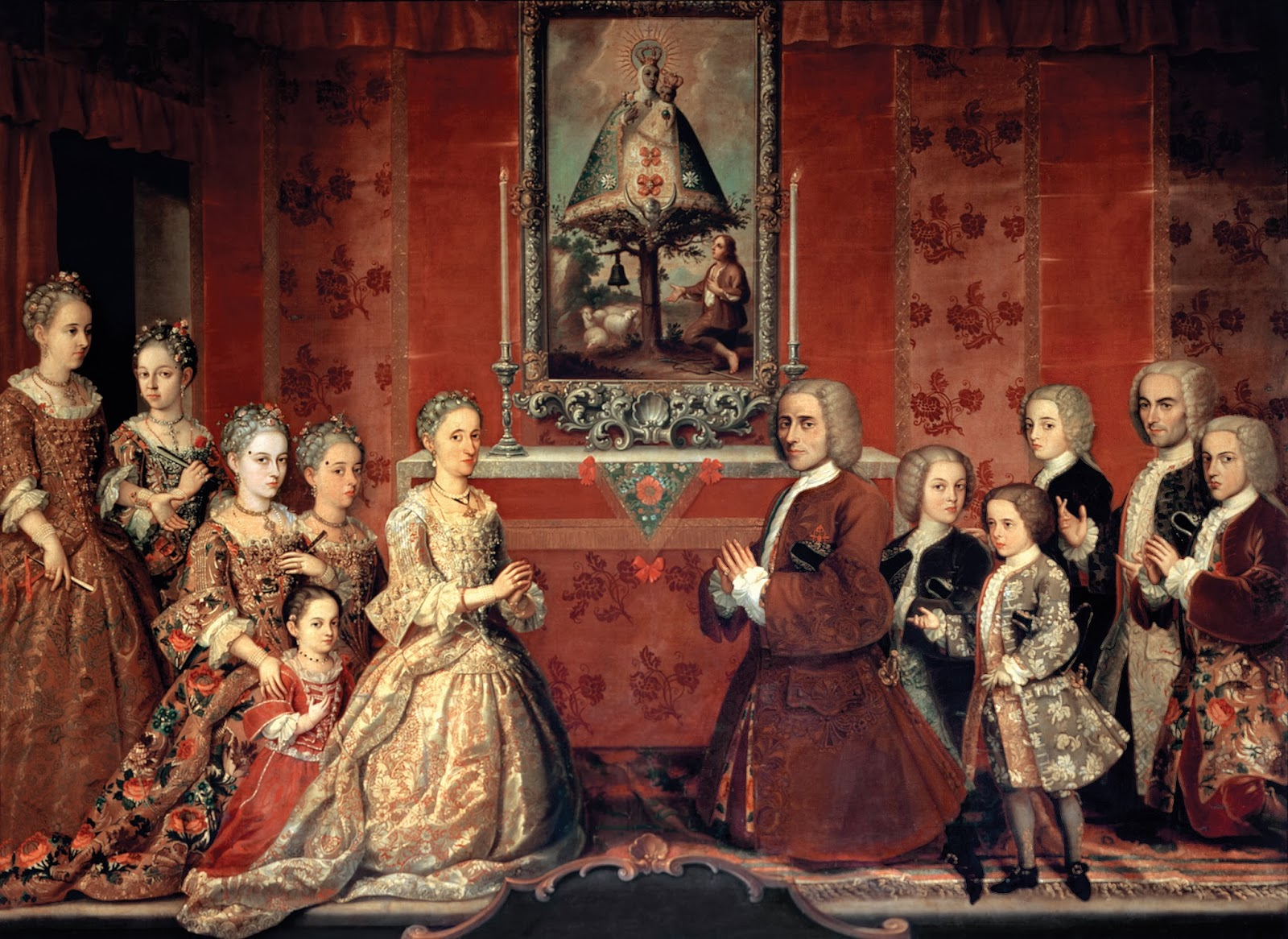
Portrait of the family Fagoaga Arozqueta, about 1730. Painter unknown. The family was part of the upper class in Mexico City, New Spain.

Historically in some cultures, members of an upper class often did not have to work for a living, as they were supported by earned or inherited investments (often real estate), although members of the upper class may have had less actual money than merchants. Upper-class status commonly derived from the social position of one's family and not from one's own achievements or wealth. Much of the population that composed the upper class consisted of aristocrats, ruling families, titled people, and religious hierarchs. These people were usually born into their status and historically there was not much movement across class boundaries.

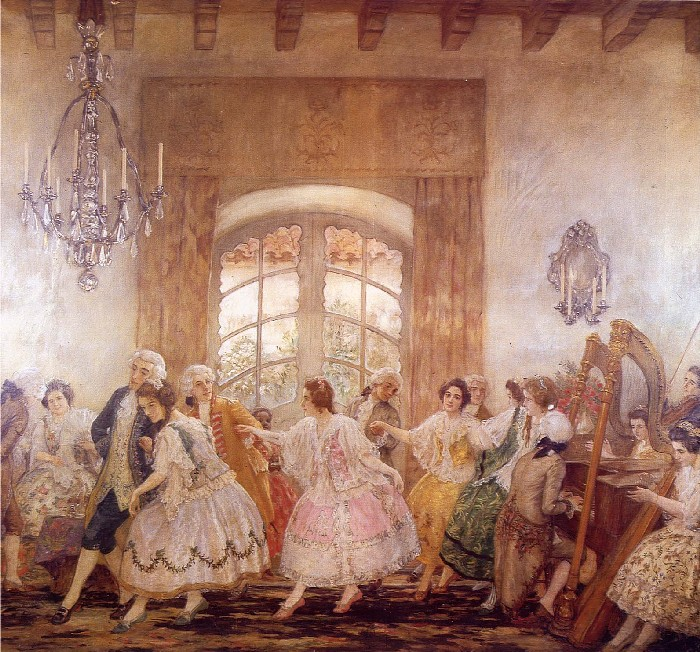
Ball in colonial Chile by Pedro Subercaseaux. In Spain's American colonies, the upper classes were made up of Europeans and American born Spaniards and were heavily influenced by European trends.

In many countries, the term "upper class" was intimately associated with hereditary land ownership. Political power was often in the hands of the landowners in many pre-industrial societies despite there being no legal barriers to land ownership for other social classes. Upper-class landowners in Europe were often also members of the titled nobility, though not necessarily: the prevalence of titles of nobility varied widely from country to country. Some upper classes were almost entirely untitled, for example, the Szlachta of the Polish–Lithuanian Commonwealth.

== Great Britain and Ireland ==
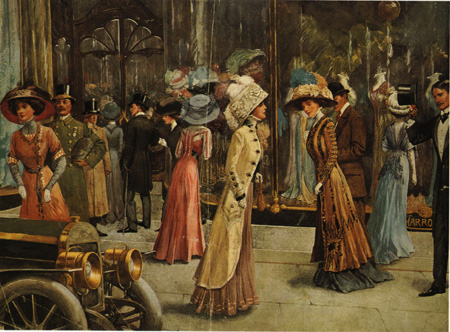
The upmarket Harrods department store in London, 1909

In Great Britain and Ireland, the "upper class" traditionally comprised the landed gentry and the aristocracy of noble families with hereditary titles. The vast majority of post-medieval aristocratic families originated in the merchant class and were ennobled between the 14th and 19th centuries while intermarrying with the old nobility and gentry. Since the Second World War, the term has come to encompass rich and powerful members of the managerial and professional classes as well. In the years since Irish independence in 1922 the upper class has all but vanished in the Republic of Ireland. Aristocratic titles within the Peerage of Ireland granted by the British monarch have no recognition in the Irish Constitution. Contemporary Ireland is generally perceived to have a two-tier social class system composed of working class and middle class (with the exception of a small number of wealthy billionaires).

== United States ==
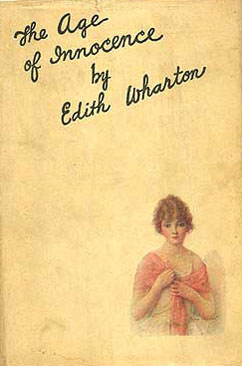
First edition dust cover of Edith Wharton's 1920 Pulitzer Prize-winning novel The Age of Innocence, a story set in upper-class New York City in the 1870s

The American upper class is a social group within the United States consisting of people who have the highest social rank primarily due to economic wealth. The American upper class is estimated to constitute less than 1% of the population. By self-identification, according to this 2001–2012 Gallup Poll data, 98% of Americans identify with the five other class terms used, 48–50% identifying as "middle class".

The main distinguishing feature of the upper class is its ability to derive enormous incomes from wealth through techniques such as money management and investing, rather than engaging in wage-labor salaried employment, although most upper-class individuals today will still hold some sort of employment, which differs from historical norms. Successful entrepreneurs, CEOs, investment bankers, venture capitalists, heir to fortunes, celebrities, and a few number of professionals, are considered members of this class by contemporary sociologists, such as James Henslin or Dennis Gilbert. There may be prestige differences between different upper-class households. An A-list actor, for example, might not be accorded as much prestige as a former U.S. President, yet all members of this class are so influential and wealthy as to be considered members of the upper class. At the pinnacle of U.S. wealth, 2004 saw a dramatic increase in the numbers of billionaires. According to Forbes Magazine, there are now 374 U.S. billionaires. The growth in billionaires took a dramatic leap since the early 1980s, when the average net worth of the individuals on the Forbes 400 list was $400 million. Today, the average net worth is $2.8 billion.

Upper-class families... dominate corporate America and have a disproportionate influence over the nation's political, educational, religious, and other institutions. Of all social classes, members of the upper class also have a strong sense of solidarity and 'consciousness of kind' that stretches across the nation and even the globe.

— William Thompson & Joseph Hickey, Society in Focus, 2005

Since the 1970s, income inequality in the United States has been increasing, with the top 1% (largely because of the top 0.1%) experiencing significantly larger gains in income than the rest of society. Alan Greenspan, former chair of the Federal Reserve, saw it as a problem for society, calling it a "very disturbing trend".

According to the book Who Rules America? by William Domhoff, the distribution of wealth in America is the primary highlight of the influence of the upper class. The top 1% of Americans own around 34% of the wealth in the U.S. while the bottom 80% own only approximately 16% of the wealth. This large disparity displays the unequal distribution of wealth in America in absolute terms.

In 1998, Bob Herbert of The New York Times referred to modern American plutocrats as "The Donor Class" (list of top donors) and defined the class, for the first time, as "a tiny group – just one-quarter of 1 percent of the population – and it is not representative of the rest of the nation. But its money buys plenty of access."

== See also ==
- Social class
- Aristocracy (class)
- Bildungsbürgertum
- Corporate class
- Debutante
- Donor Class
- Epstein class
- Fat cat (term)
- Gentry
- Grand Burgher (German Großbürger)
- High society (social class)
- International Debutante Ball
- Landed gentry
- Nobility
- Nouveau riche
- Old money
- Patrician (post-Roman Europe)
- Social status
- Socialite
- High-net-worth individual
- Ultra high-net-worth individual
