= Elite =

Group or class of persons enjoying superior status

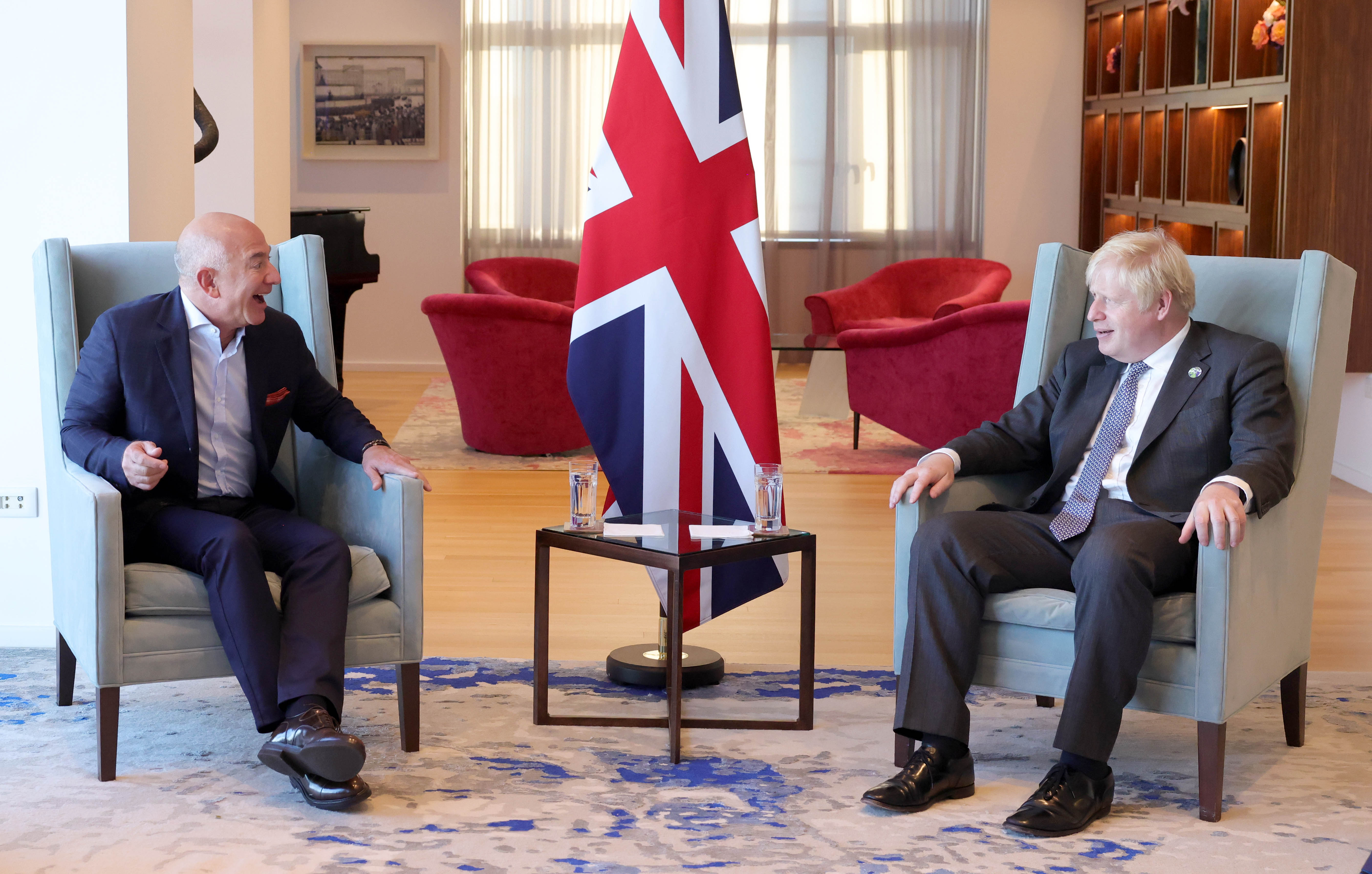
American Amazon CEO Jeff Bezos (left), the world's first centibillionaire whose 2026 net worth was estimated at $370 billion, is commonly considered part of the global elite. He is speaking to millionaire and former Prime Minister of the United Kingdom Boris Johnson (right) at the 76th United Nations General Assembly.

In political and sociological theory, the elite (/ɛ.ˈliːt/ or /ɪ.ˈliːt/; from French: élite, from Latin: eligere, to select or to sort out) are a small group of powerful or wealthy people who hold a disproportionate amount of wealth, privilege, political power, or skill in a group. Defined by the Cambridge Dictionary, the "elite" are "the richest, most powerful, best-educated, or best-trained group in a society".

American sociologist C. Wright Mills states that members of the elite accept their fellows' position of importance in society. "As a rule, 'they accept one another, understand one another, marry one another, tend to work, and to think, if not together at least alike'." It is a well-regulated existence where education plays a critical role.

== American universities ==
From an early age, upper-class members attend prominent preparatory schools, which open doors to elite universities, known as the Ivy League, which includes Harvard University, Yale University, Princeton University, Columbia University and the University of Pennsylvania (among others), and the universities' respective highly exclusive clubs, such as the Harvard Club of Boston, Harvard Club of New York City, The Yale Club of New York City, Penn Club of New York and Columbia University Club of New York. These memberships, in turn, pave the way to prominent social clubs in major cities and serve as venues for important business contacts.

A 2025 study analyzed the educational backgrounds of 6,141 of the world's most influential people and found that a small number of universities educate the global elite, especially Harvard. Ranked in terms of number of alumni who went on to elite positions, Harvard was followed by Stanford University, the University of Oxford, the University of Pennsylvania, Columbia University, Yale University, the Massachusetts Institute of Technology, the University of Chicago, and the University of California, Berkeley. If American elite schools are removed, Oxford leads the list, followed by the University of Cambridge, the London School of Economics, the École nationale d'administration, the University of Tokyo, Sciences Po, and MIT.

== Elitist privilege ==
According to Mills, men receive the education necessary for elitist privilege to obtain their background and contacts, allowing them to enter three branches of the power elite, which are:

- Political leadership: Mills contended that since the end of World War II, corporate leaders had become more prominent in the political process, with a decline in central decision-making for professional politicians.
- Military Circle: In Mills' time—the 1950s—a heightened concern about warfare existed, making top military leaders and such issues as defense funding and personnel recruitment very important. Most prominent corporate leaders and politicians were strong proponents of military spending.
- Corporate elite: According to Mills, in the 1950s, when the military emphasis was pronounced, it was corporate leaders working with prominent military officers who dominated the development of policies. These two groups tended to be mutually supportive.

According to Mills, the governing elite in the United States primarily draws its members from political leaders, including the president, and a handful of key cabinet members, as well as close advisers, major corporate owners and directors, and high-ranking military officers. These groups overlap; elites tend to circulate from one sector to another, consolidating power in the process.

Unlike the ruling class, a social formation based on heritage and social ties, the power elite is characterized by the organizational structures through which it acquires wealth. According to Mills, the power elite rose from "the managerial reorganization of the propertied classes into the more or less unified stratum of the corporate rich". In G. William Domhoff's sociology textbooks, Who Rules America? editions, he further clarified the differences in the two terms:

"The upper class as a whole does not do the ruling. Instead, class rule is manifested through the activities of a wide variety of organizations and institutions [...] Leaders within the upper class join with high-level employees in the organizations they control to make up what will be called the power elite".

The Marxist theoretician Nikolai Bukharin anticipated the elite theory in his 1929 work, Imperialism and World Economy:

"present-day state power is nothing but an entrepreneurs' company of tremendous power, headed even by the same persons that occupy the leading positions in the banking and syndicate offices".

== Global elite ==
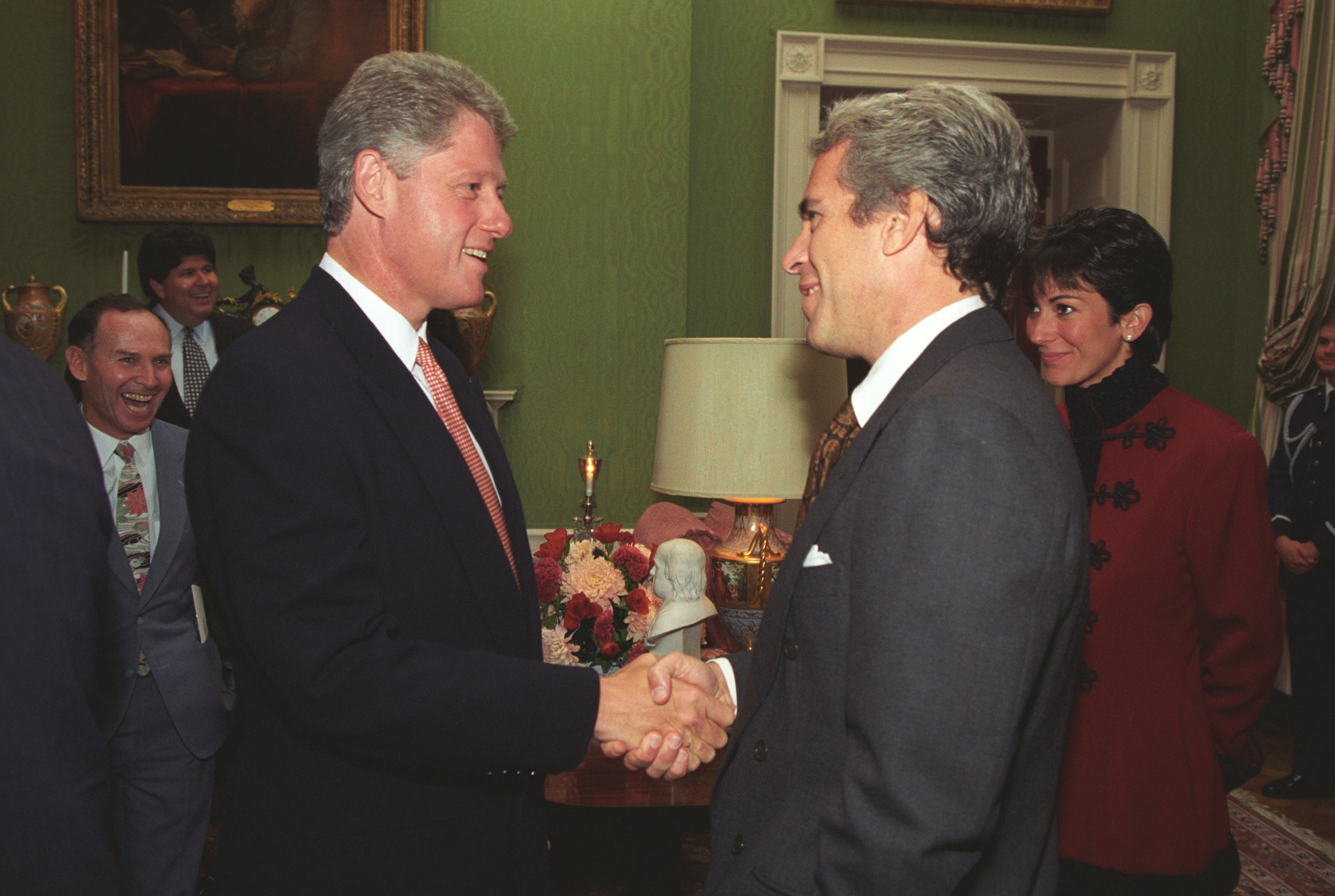
Bill Clinton (left middle), Jeffrey Epstein (right middle), and Ghislaine Maxwell (right) have been characterized as associating with the global elite.

The term "global elite" (sometimes called the "Epstein class") has been used to describe a subset of the elite that leverages international connections for political and economic gain, often taking international trips in private jets to visit other members of the global elite.

Mills determined that there is an "inner core" of the power elite involving individuals who are able to move from one seat of institutional power to another. They therefore have a wide range of knowledge and interests in many influential organizations, and are, as Mills describes, "professional go-betweens of economic, political, and military affairs". Relentless expansion of capitalism and the globalizing of economic and military power bind leaders of the power elite into complex relationships with nation states that generate global-scale class divisions. Sociologist Manuel Castells writes in The Rise of the Network Society that contemporary globalization does not mean that "everything in the global economy is global".

Global economies may be characterized by fundamental social inequalities with respect to the "level of integration, competitive potential and share of the benefits from economic growth". Castells cites a kind of "double movement" where on one hand, "valuable segments of territories and people" become "linked in the global networks of value making and wealth appropriation", while, on the other, "everything and everyone" that is not valued by established networks gets "switched off [...] and ultimately discarded". These evolutions have also led social scientists to explore empirically the possible emergence of a new transnational and cohesive social class at the top of the social ladder: a global oligarchy or super-bourgeoisie elite. The wide-ranging effects of global capitalism ultimately affect everyone on the planet, as economies around the world come to depend on the functioning of global financial markets, technologies, trade, and labor.

World Economic Forum (WEF)

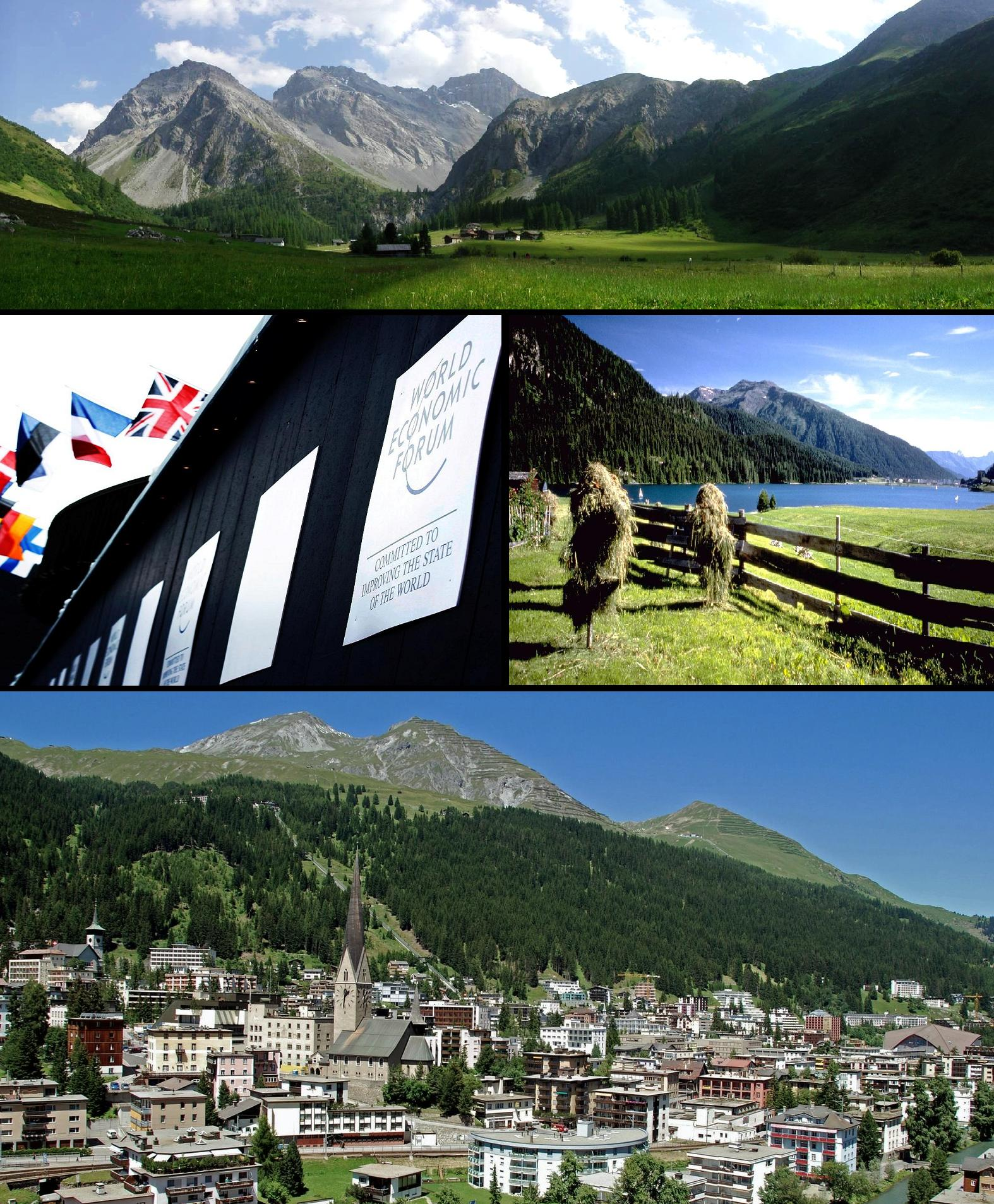
City of Davos

The World Economic Forum (WEF) is an international advocacy non-governmental organization and think tank, based in Cologny, Canton of Geneva, Switzerland. It was founded on 24 January 1971 by German engineer Klaus Schwab. The foundation's stated mission is "improving the state of the world by engaging business, political, academic, and other leaders of society to shape global, regional, and industry agendas".

The WEF is hosted in Davos, an Alpine resort town and municipality in the Prättigau/Davos Region in the canton of the Grisons, Switzerland.

Detached elite

The formation of a detached elite, sometimes labeled with the neologism "Davos Man", refers to a global group whose members view themselves as completely "international". The term refers to people who "have little need for national loyalty, view national boundaries as obstacles, and see national governments as residues from the past whose only useful function is to facilitate the elite's global operations" according to political scientist Samuel P. Huntington, who is credited with inventing the neologism. In his 2004 article "Dead Souls: The Denationalization of the American Elite", Huntington argues that this international perspective is a minority elitist position not shared by the nationalist majority of the people.

The Transnational Institute describes the World Economic Forum's main purpose as being "to function as a socializing institution for the emerging global elite, globalization's "Mafiocracy" of bankers, industrialists, oligarchs, technocrats and politicians. They promote common ideas, and serve common interests: their own".

In 2019, the Manager Magazin journalist Henrik Müller argued that the "Davos Man" had already decayed into different groups and camps. He saw three central drivers for this development:

In 2022 the term was again used in a book by The New York Times journalist Peter S. Goodman. Titled Davos Man: How the Billionaires Devoured the World, it was described as a passionate book against global financial inequality.

Corporate capture of global and democratic institutions

The World Economic Forum's "Global Redesign" report suggests to create "public-private" United Nations (UN) in which selected agencies operate and steer global agendas under shared governance systems.

In September 2019, more than 400 civil society organizations and 40 international networks heavily criticised a partnership agreement between WEF and the United Nations and called on the UN secretary-general to end it. They see such an agreement as a "disturbing corporate capture of the UN, which moved the world dangerously towards a privatised global governance". The Dutch Transnational Institute think tank summarises that we are increasingly entering a world where gatherings such as Davos are "a silent global coup d'état" to capture governance.

Also in September 2019, the award-winning HBO satirical comedy-drama Succession — considered one of the greatest television shows of all time — aired the episode "Argestes", which received a Rotten Tomato score of 100%. Commentators characterized the episode as social commentary against the wealth and power of the global elite at the World Economic Forum.

WEF protests

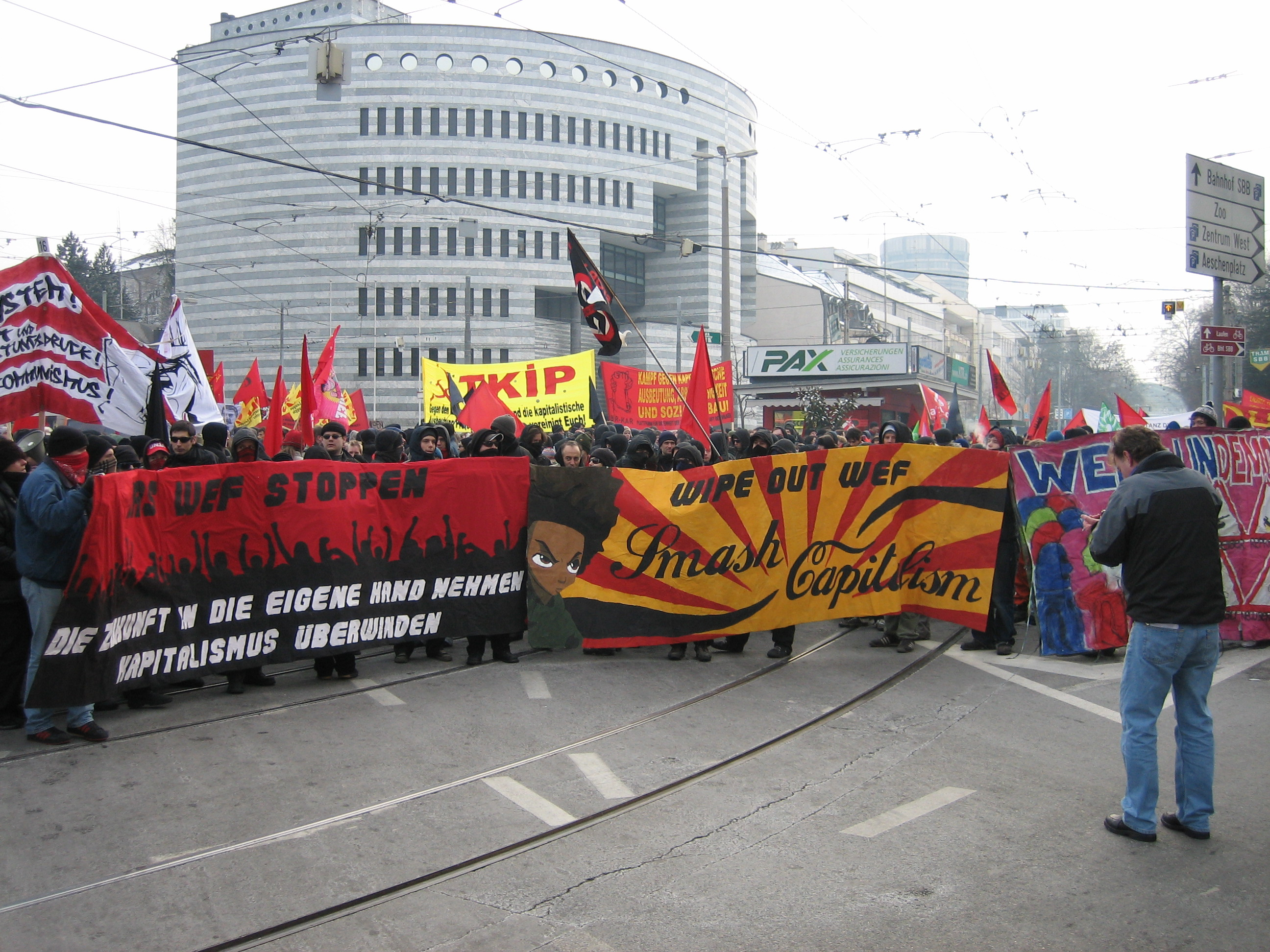
German black bloc protesters hold a sign saying to wipe out the World Economic Forum, 2006

During the late 1990s, the WEF, as well as the G7, World Bank, World Trade Organization, and International Monetary Fund, came under heavy criticism by anti-globalization activists who asserted that capitalism and globalization were increasing poverty and destroying the environment. In 2000, about 10,000 demonstrators disrupted a regional WEF meeting in Melbourne, by obstructing the path of 200 delegates. Small demonstrations are held in Davos on most but not all years, organised by the local Green Party (see Anti-WEF protests in Switzerland, January 2003) to protest against what have been called the meetings of "fat cats in the snow", a tongue-in-cheek term used by rock singer Bono.

After 2014, the physical protest movement against the World Economic Forum largely died down, and Swiss police noted a significant decline in attending protesters, 20 at most during the meeting in 2016. While protesters are still more numerous in large Swiss cities, the protest movement itself has undergone significant change. Around 150 Tibetans and Uighurs protested in Geneva and 400 Tibetans in Bern against the visit of China's paramount leader Xi Jinping for the 2017 meeting, with subsequent confrontations and arrests.

== Power elite ==
The term power elite is used by Mills to describe a relatively small, loosely connected group of individuals who dominate American policymaking. This group includes bureaucratic, corporate, intellectual, military, media, and government elites who control the principal institutions in the United States and whose opinions and actions influence policymakers' decisions. The basis for membership of a power elite is institutional power, namely an influential position within a prominent private or public organization. A study of the French corporate elite has shown that social class continues to hold sway in determining who joins this elite group, with those from the upper-middle class tending to dominate.

Another study (published in 2002) of power elites in the United States during the administration of President George W. Bush (in office from 2001 to 2009) identified 7,314 institutional positions of power encompassing 5,778 individuals. A later study of U.S. society noted demographic characteristics of this elite group as follows:

=== Age ===
Corporate leaders aged about 60; heads of foundations, law, education, and civic organizations aged around 62; government employees aged about 56.

=== Gender ===
Men contribute roughly 80% in the political realm, whereas women contribute roughly only 20% in the political realm. In the economic denomination, as of October 2017, only 32 (6.4%) of the Fortune 500 CEOs are women.

=== Ethnicity ===
In the U.S., White Anglo-Saxons dominate in the power elite. While Protestants represent about 80% of the top business leaders, about 54% of the members of Congress of any ethnicity are also Protestant. As of October 2017, only 4 (0.8%) of the Fortune 500 CEOs are African American. In similarly low proportions, as of October 2017, 10 (2%) of the Fortune 500 CEOs are Latino, and 10 (2%) are Asian.

=== Education ===
Nearly all the leaders have a college education, with almost half graduating with advanced degrees. About 54% of the big-business leaders, and 42% of the government elite, graduated from just 12 prestigious universities with large endowments.

=== Social clubs ===
Most holders of top positions in the power elite possess exclusive membership to one or more social clubs. About a third belong to a small number of especially prestigious clubs in major cities like London, New York City, Chicago, Boston, and Washington, D.C.

== Impacts on economy ==
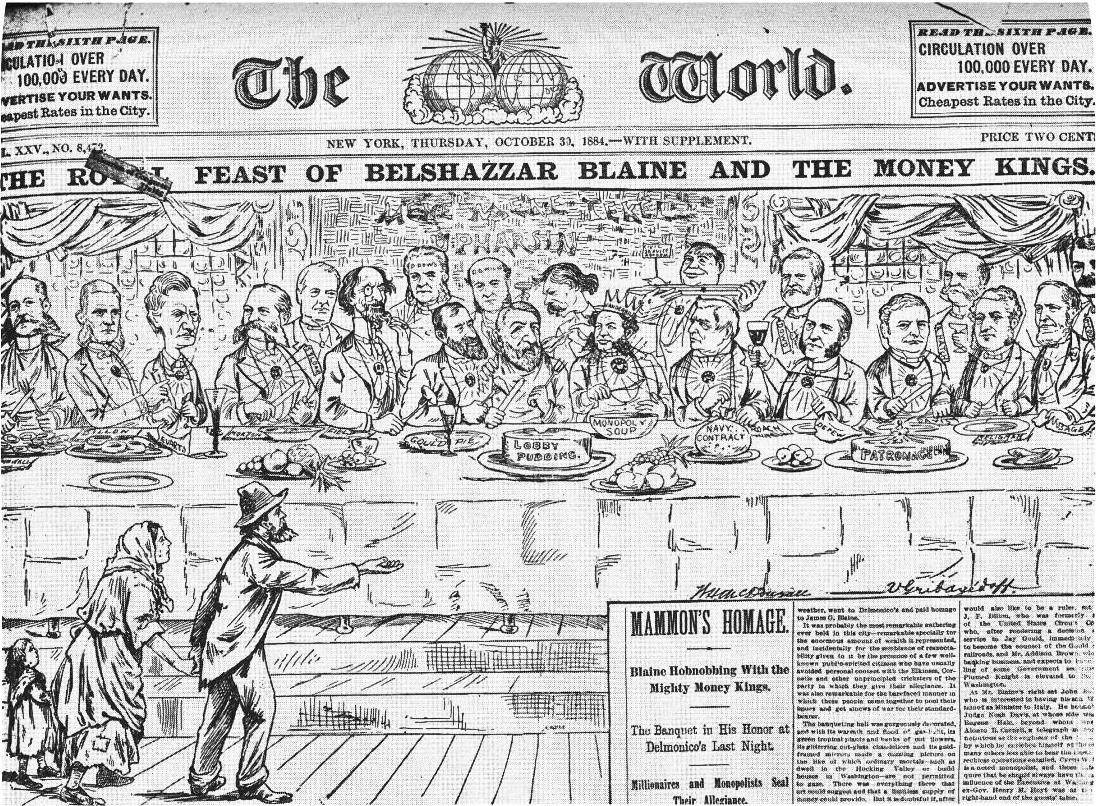
Political cartoon parodying James G. Blaine with his wealthy donors feasting at a table at Delmonico's while a poor family begs beneath. Illustrated by Walt McDougall and Valerian Gribayedoff and originally printed in New York World, October 30, 1884.

In the 1970s, an organized set of policies promoted reduced taxes, especially for the wealthy, and a steady erosion of the welfare safety net. Starting with legislation in the 1980s, the wealthy banking community successfully lobbied for reduced regulation. The wide range of financial and social capital accessible to the power elite gives their members heavy influence in economic and political decision making, allowing them to move toward attaining desired outcomes. Sociologist Christopher Doob gives a hypothetical alternative, stating that these elite individuals would consider themselves the overseers of the national economy. Also appreciating that it is not only a moral, but a practical necessity to focus beyond their group interests. Doing so would hopefully alleviate various destructive conditions affecting large numbers of less affluent citizens.

== See also ==
- Alpha (ethology)
- Boston Brahmin
- Bourgeoisie
- Cabal
- Conflict theories
- Economic history of Canada#Business elite
- Elite overproduction
- Elite theory
- Elitism
- International Debutante Ball
- Invisible Class Empire
- Jet set
- Liberal elite
- Plutocracy
- Political class
- The Establishment
- The powers that be
