= Political Parties =

1911 book by Robert Michels

Political Parties: A Sociological Study of the Oligarchical Tendencies of Modern Democracy
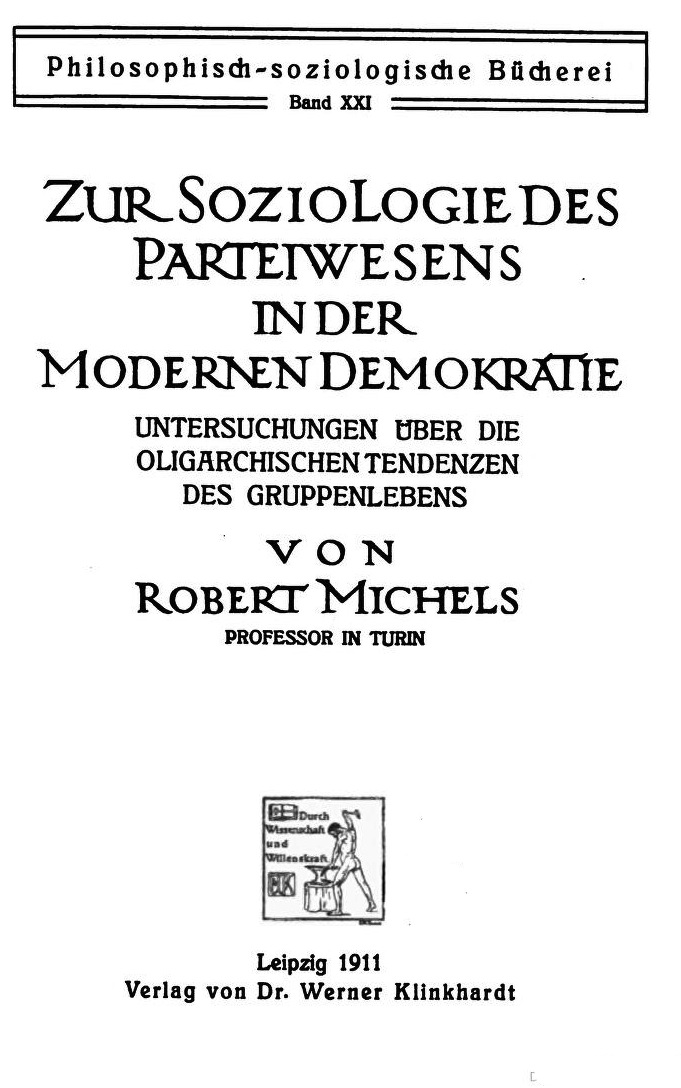
- Author: Robert Michels
- Original title: Zur Soziologie des Parteiwesens in der modernen Demokratie; Untersuchungen über die oligarchischen Tendenzen des Gruppenlebens
- Translators: Eden Paul; Cedar Paul
- Language: German
- Publisher: Werner Klinkhardt
- Publication date: 1911
- Publication place: Germany
- English publication date: 1915
- Pages: 401
- OCLC: 02067594
- Dewey Decimal: 329.02
- LC Class: JF2049 .M6
- Original text: Zur Soziologie des Parteiwesens in der modernen Demokratie; Untersuchungen über die oligarchischen Tendenzen des Gruppenlebens at Internet Archive
- Translation: Political Parties: A Sociological Study of the Oligarchical Tendencies of Modern Democracy at Internet Archive

Political Parties: A Sociological Study of the Oligarchical Tendencies of Modern Democracy (German: Zur Soziologie des Parteiwesens in der modernen Demokratie; Untersuchungen über die oligarchischen Tendenzen des Gruppenlebens) is a book by the German-born Italian sociologist Robert Michels, published in 1911 and first introducing the concept of iron law of oligarchy. It is considered one of the classics of social sciences, in particular sociology and political science.

It was translated to Italian as Sociologia del partito politico nella democrazia moderna: studi sulle tendenze oligarchiche degli aggregati politici by Alfredo Polledro in 1912, and then translated from the Italian to English by Eden Paul and Cedar Paul for Hearst's International Library Co. in 1915.

This work analyses the power structures of organizations such as political parties and trade unions. Michels's main argument is that all organizations, even those in theory most egalitarian and most committed to democracy – like socialist political parties – are in fact oligarchical, and dominated by a small group of leadership.

The book also provides a first systematic analysis of how a radical political party loses its radical goals under the dynamics of electoral participation. The origins of moderation theory can be found in this analysis.

== Synopsis ==
Michels put forward a thesis about incompatibility of democracy and large-scale social organizations. He observed that contrary to democratic and egalitarian principles, both society in general, and specific organizations in particular are dominated by the leadership – the oligarchy. This, according to Michels, was not because of any particular weakness of a particular society or organization in question, but a characteristic of any and all complex social systems. Such social systems have to be organized along bureaucratic lines, managed by departments staffed with non-elected officials, and bureaucracies inevitably develop oligarchies. Michels concluded that in any complex organization, and such dominate the modern world, it is impossible to escape domination of oligarchy – a conclusion which became known as the iron law of oligarchy.

"Who says organization, says oligarchy"

The iron law of oligarchy is based on the following logic. First, any large scale organization will necessitate the development of bureaucracy for efficient administration. Such leaders will amass resources (superior knowledge control over the formal means of communication with the membership, and the skill in the art of politics) giving them power at the expense of rank and file members.

"Large-scale organizations give their officers a near monopoly of power"

Second, Michels expressed doubts about whether the rank and file possess the skills necessary to compete with the leaders, a concept he phrased as the "incompetence of the masses". In order to prevent the development of an oligarchy, the regular members must be involved in various activities of the organizations; however, reality of time constraints due to work, family and leisure will reduce the amount of time that most such members are willing to dedicate to active involvement in organizational activities and politics. This is compounded by the rank and file lack of education, and corresponding sophistication of the leadership.

"The masses are incapable of taking part in the decision-making process and desire strong leadership."

In his case study of his contemporary socialist parties, primarily the German Social Democratic Party. It was a radical organization in his time, fighting for novel concepts such as adult suffrage, free speech, and popular participation in the government. Michels described how their political program was overshadowed by the expansion of the organization favoured by the administrative bureaucracy. This, Michels observed, can be explained thus: "it is far from obvious that the interests of the masses which have combined to form the party will coincide with the interests of the bureaucracy in which the party becomes personified." Michels noted that if an organization dedicated to such principles failed to realize its democratic ideals in its own governance, it is unlikely that other organizations, even less concerned with such lofty goals, would be able to function as democracies.

"The socialists might conquer, but not socialism, which would perish in the moment of its adherents' triumph"

== Significance ==
Michels book quickly became a classic of social sciences. His theory was quickly vindicated on a large scale during First World War, when most socialist parties of that time endorsed the war policies of their respective governments, thus showing that their corresponding party leaders put the short-term goals of organizational survival (allying with the state) over doctrinal points of "proletariat against bourgeoisie".

Sigmund Neumann said that "the study of sociology of political parties have been completely dominated by Robert Michels' iron law of [oligarchy]." Michels work significantly influenced the views on political party theory by his friend and one of the founding fathers of sociology, Max Weber. A number of other theorists of political parties acknowledged that this work was a major influence on theirs, including James Bryce, 1st Viscount Bryce, Maurice Duverger, and Robert McKenzie, among others.

Beyond political parties, Michels work was used to explain the functioning of numerous other voluntary organizations from trade unions to medical associations. His theories are also seen as being applicable and influential to the study of all organizations in general, as well as theories of bureaucracy.

== Criticism ==
Michels' argument has been criticized for being over-deterministic and overly critical of bureaucracy.

== Quotes ==
- "A party of the landed gentry which should appeal only to the members of its own class and to those of identical economic interests, would not win a single seat, would not send a single representative to parliament. A conservative candidate who should present himself to his electors by declaring to them that he did not regard them as capable of playing an active part in influencing the destinies of the country, and should tell them that for this reason they ought to be deprived of the suffrage, would be a man of incomparable sincerity, but politically insane."

== See also ==
- Elite theory
- Pareto principle
- Power law
- Union Democracy
