= Union Democracy =

1956 book

- Authors: Seymour Martin Lipset; Martin Trow; James Samuel Coleman
- Language: English
- Publisher: Free Press
- Publication date: 1956
- Publication place: United States
- Pages: 455
- ISBN: 978-0-02-919210-8

Union Democracy: The Internal Politics of the International Typographical Union is a book by Seymour Martin Lipset, Martin Trow and James S. Coleman, originally published by New York Free Press in 1956.

The book is a case study of one particular organization: the International Typographical Union, an organization seen by the authors as the most democratic one in the contemporary (1950s) United States; an organization that seemingly disproved Robert Michels' Iron law of oligarchy.

== Overview ==
The book addresses the factors that influence the power structure and decision making processes in organizations, with a specific focus on the political systems of democracy and oligarchy. The problem seen as central by the authors was the difficulty of maintaining democracy in organizations. The issue was first raised by Robert Michels in his Political Parties and termed the Iron law of oligarchy: all forms of organization, regardless of how democratic or autocratic they may be at the start, will eventually and inevitably develop into oligarchies. As organization increases in size, its bureaucracy will grow as well, and leaders of bureaucracy will use their position to increase and entrench their powers, departing further and further from any ideals of democracy the organization might have once possessed (Michels studied organizations that one would expect to be quite democratic: socialist parties and trade unions).

The book is a case study of one particular organization: the International Typographical Union, organization seen by the authors as the most democratic one in the contemporary (1950s) United States; an organization that seemingly disproved Michels' iron law. Lipset noticed that ITU formed an interesting contradiction to the iron law in the 1940s, while studying under one of the 'giants' of sociology, Robert K. Merton, who encouraged him to develop those ideas into an article, and later, a book, a task that Lipset approached with the help of two other researchers, Martin Trow and James S. Coleman. In the course of his research Lipset and others interviewed over 400 members of the ITU.

Lipset, Trow and Coleman largely agree with Michels that there are oligarchical bureaucratic tendencies in all organizations. They point to several factors that made ITU different from most other unions—and organizations—and thus able to defy the iron law. They noted that unlike most of such organizations, ITU was founded by a group of local unions valuing their autonomy. The existence of factions within the democratic structure (elections) of the union prevented leaders from becoming too corrupt, as each faction was always willing to expose the misdoings of another. They also point out that similarity between background of members (most of them coming from middle class) further encouraged democratic decision making processes.

One of the conclusions that Lipset, Trow and Coleman researched was that behaviour of individuals could be related to the qualities of local environments (groups) and their leaders.

The book was and still is widely cited in the field of sociology and political science, particularly in the subfield of organizational studies.

== See also ==
- Labor Management Reporting and Disclosure Act of 1959
