= Neema Parvini =

British academic

- Known for: Elite theory, historic recurrence, literary criticism

Academic background
- Education: Royal Holloway, University of London (BA); University of Oxford (MA); Royal Holloway, University of London (PhD)

Academic work
- Institutions: Richmond American University London; University of Surrey; University of Buckingham
- Other name: AA

YouTube information
- Channels: @AcademicAgent; @AcademicAgentMindset; @AcademicAgentGaming
- Years active: 2016–present
- Subscribers: 149 thousand (combined)
- Views: 43 million (combined)
- Last updated: 5 August 2026
- Website: www.academic-agency.com

Neema Parvini, also known as Academic Agent, is a British academic, writer, and YouTuber. As of 2026, he is an honorary research fellow at the Centre of Heterodox Studies at the University of Buckingham. He has worked at Richmond American University London, Brunel University of London, Royal Holloway, and the University of Surrey.

== Biography ==
Parvini was born to a Welsh mother and Iranian father. He graduated from Royal Holloway, University of London, completing his masters in 2005 at the University of Oxford, and returning to Royal Holloway for his PhD, for which he was awarded a Thomas Holloway Scholarship; he completed his PhD in 2010.

He was trained as a literature scholar, and his books on William Shakespeare mainly discuss the influence of new historicism, cognitive approaches to Shakespeare studies, and ethical thinking in Shakespeare's works. He has written for the online magazine Quillette and the Ludwig von Mises Institute, and has spoken at the think-tank Traditional Britain. Parvini is a member of the Heterodox Academy and the Evolution Institute, and attended the Battle of Ideas event run by the Institute of Art and Ideas. He is a Senior Fellow at the Centre for Heterodox Social Science.

Parvini discusses political theories on the rule of elites on his YouTube page "Academic Agent", which he started in 2016.

In Bournbrook Magazine, Alexander Adams describes Parvini's book The Populist Delusion as "an informative, succinctly-written and accessible handbook for those who wish to understand the core principles of elite theory discussed by reactionaries and the dissident right". It was an Amazon best seller. The New York Times considered him to have helped popularise the term "slopulism".

== Publications ==
- Shakespeare’s History Plays: Rethinking Historicism (Edinburgh University Press, 2012).
- Shakespeare and Contemporary Theory: New Historicism and Cultural Materialism (Bloomsbury, 2012).
- Shakespeare and Cognition: Thinking Fast and Slow Through Character (Palgrave, 2015).
- Shakespeare and New Historicist Theory (Bloomsbury Arden Shakespeare, 2017).
- Shakespeare's Moral Compass: Ethical Thinking in his Plays (Edinburgh University Press, 2018).
- The Defenders of Liberty: Human nature, Individualism, and Property Rights (Palgrave Macmillan, 2020).
- The Populist Delusion (Imperium Press, 2022).
- The Prophets of Doom (Imprint Academic, 2023).
- Applied Elite Theory (Imperium Press, 2025).
- Foundations of Shakespeare (Imprint Academic, 2026).
