= Elite theory =

Theory of the state

In philosophy, political science and sociology, elite theory is a theory of the state that seeks to describe and explain power relations in society. In its contemporary form in the 21st century, elite theory posits that power in larger societies, especially nation-states, is concentrated at the top in relatively small elites; that power "flows predominantly in a top-down direction from elites to non-elites"; and that "the characteristics and actions of elites are crucial determinants of major political and social outcomes".

The concept of the "elite" in this context goes beyond politicians or other leaders who wield the formal power of the state. Through positions in corporations, influence over policymaking networks, control over the financial support of foundations, and positions with think tanks, universities, or other policy-discussion groups, members of the elite exert significant power over corporate, government, and societal decisions. The basic characteristics of this theory are that power is concentrated, the elites are unified, the non-elites are diverse and powerless, elites' interests are unified due to common backgrounds and positions, and the defining characteristic of power is institutional position. Elite theory opposes pluralism, a tradition that emphasizes how multiple major social groups and interests contribute to representative political outcomes that reflect the collective needs of society.

Even when entire groups are ostensibly completely excluded from the state's traditional networks of power (on the basis of criteria such as gender, nobility, race, religion or poverty), elite theory recognizes that "counter-elites" frequently develop within such excluded groups. Negotiations between such disenfranchised groups and the state can be analyzed as negotiations between elites and counter-elites. A major problem, in turn, is the ability of elites to co-opt counter-elites.

Democratic systems function on the premise that voting behaviour has a direct and noticeable effect on policy outcomes, and that these outcomes are preferred by the largest portion of voters. However, a study in 2014 correlated preferences of voters in the United States to policy outcomes and found that the statistical correlation between the two is heavily dependent on the income brackets of the voting groups. At the lowest income bracket sampled, the correlation coefficient reached zero, whereas the highest income bracket returned a correlation above 0.6. The conclusion was that there is a strong, linear correlation between the income of United States voters and how often their policy preferences become reality. The causation for this correlation has not yet been proven in subsequent studies, but it is an area ripe for further research.

== History ==
=== Ancient perspective ===
In his Histories, the ancient Greek historian and politician Polybius in the 2nd century BC referred to what is today called elite theory simply as "autocracy". He posits that all three originating forms of sources of political power — one man (monarchy/executive), few men (aristocracy), many men (democracy) — will eventually be corrupted into debased forms of themselves if not balanced in a "mixed government". Monarchy will become "tyranny", democracy will become "mob rule", and rule by elites (aristocracy) will become "oligarchy". Polybius effectively says this is due to a failure to properly apply checks and balances between the three mentioned forms as well as subsequent political institutions.

=== Italian school of elitism ===
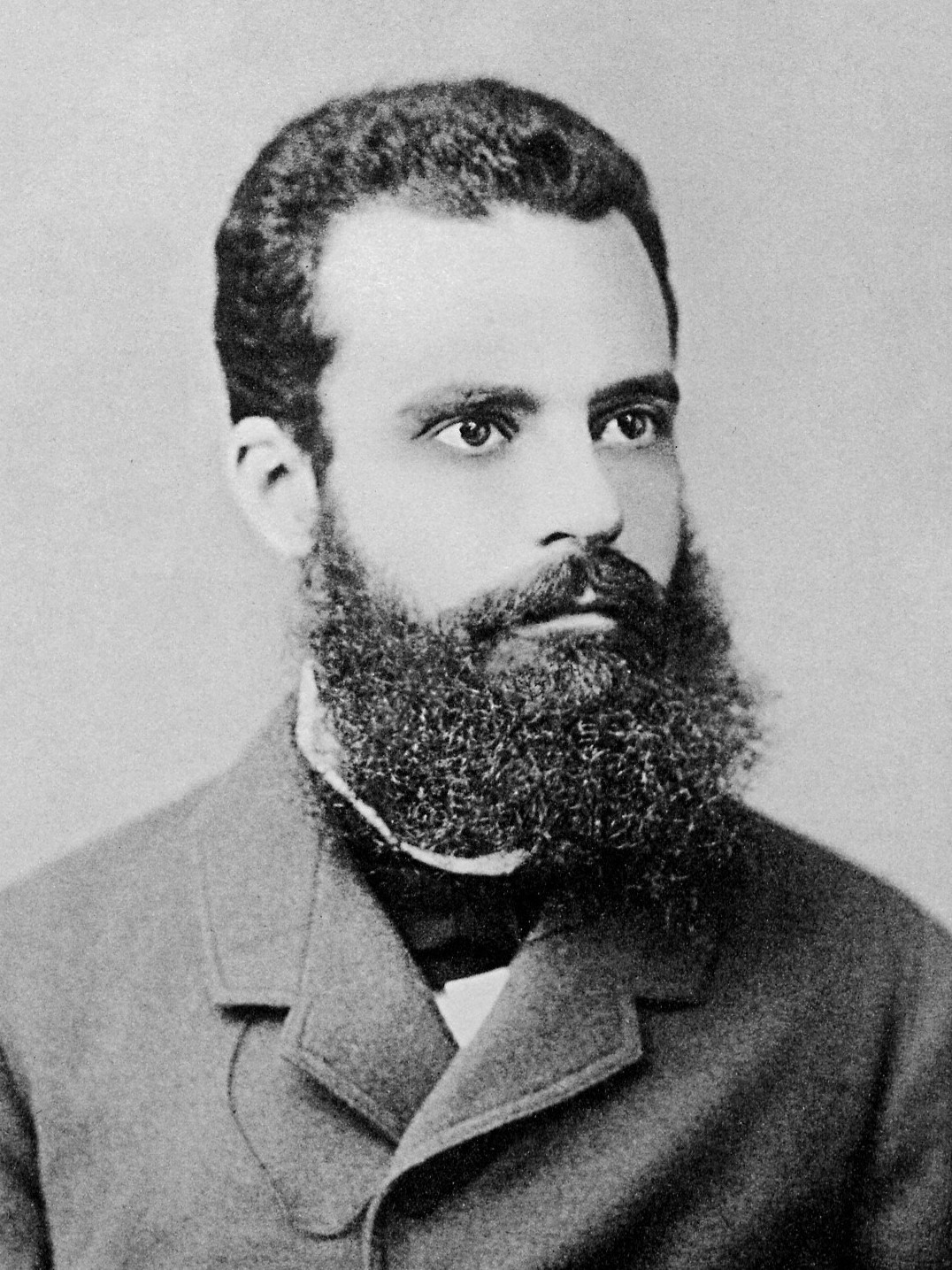
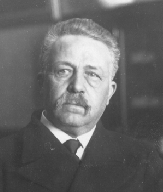
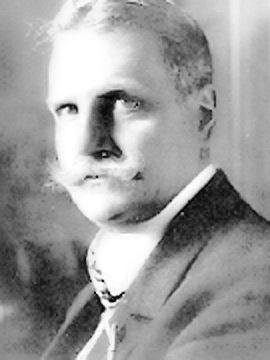
Vilfredo Pareto, Gaetano Mosca, and Robert Michels

Vilfredo Pareto (1848–1923), Gaetano Mosca (1858–1941) and Robert Michels (1876–1936) were co-founders of the Italian school of elitism, which influenced subsequent elite theory in the Western tradition.

The outlook of the Italian school of elitism is based on two ideas:

1. Power lies in positions of authority in key economic and political institutions.
2. The psychological difference that sets elites apart is that they have personal resources, for instance intelligence and skills, and a vested interest in the government; whilst the rest are incompetent and do not have the capabilities to govern themselves, the elite are resourceful and strive to make the government work. For, in reality, the elite would have the most to lose in a failed state.

==== Vilfredo Pareto ====
Pareto emphasized the psychological and intellectual superiority of elites, believing that they were the highest accomplishers in any field. He discussed the existence of two types of elites:

1. Governing elites
2. Non-governing elites

He also extended the idea that a whole elite can be replaced by a new one and how one can circulate from being elite to non-elite.

==== Gaetano Mosca ====
Mosca emphasized the sociological and personal characteristics of elites. He said elites are an organized minority and that the masses are an unorganized majority. The ruling class is composed of the ruling elite and the sub-elites. He divides the world into two groups:

1. Political class
2. Non-political class

Mosca asserted that the political class was an organized minority of people ruling over the disorganized "mass" of the non-political class, justifying their power with the use of a "political formula". Mosca's work also attacks racial/climatological and Marxist views of history as being either completely false, or extremely limited in scope, respectively.

==== Robert Michels ====
Michels developed the iron law of oligarchy where, he asserts, social and political organizations are run by a few individuals, and social organization and labour division are key. He believed that all organizations were elitist and that elites have three basic principles that help in the bureaucratic structure of political organization:

1. Need for leaders, specialized staff, and facilities
2. Utilization of facilities by leaders within their organization
3. The importance of the psychological attributes of the leaders

=== Contemporary elite theorists ===
Modern elite theory is distinguished from classical elite theory as articulated by Mosca, Pareto and Michels in that it attempts to merely present an "empirical picture of the way human societies operate", without presenting a claim about how societies should be organized. While both are primarily descriptive in nature, classical elite theorists concluded that rule by a minority was a constant across all political systems.

==== Elmer Eric Schattschneider ====
Elmer Eric Schattschneider offers a strong critique of the American political theory of pluralism: Rather than an essentially democratic system in which the many competing interests of citizens are amply represented, if not advanced, by equally many competing interest groups, Schattschneider argues that the pressure system is biased in favour of "the most educated and highest-income members of society", and shows that "the difference between those who participate in interest group activity and those who stand at the sidelines is much greater than between voters and nonvoters".

In The Semisovereign People, Schattschneider argues that the scope of the pressure system is really quite small: The "range of organized, identifiable, known groups is amazingly narrow; there is nothing remotely universal about it" and the "business or upper-class bias of the pressure system shows up everywhere". He said that the "notion that the pressure system is automatically representative of the whole community is a myth" and, instead, the "system is skewed, loaded and unbalanced in favor of a fraction of a minority".

==== C. Wright Mills ====
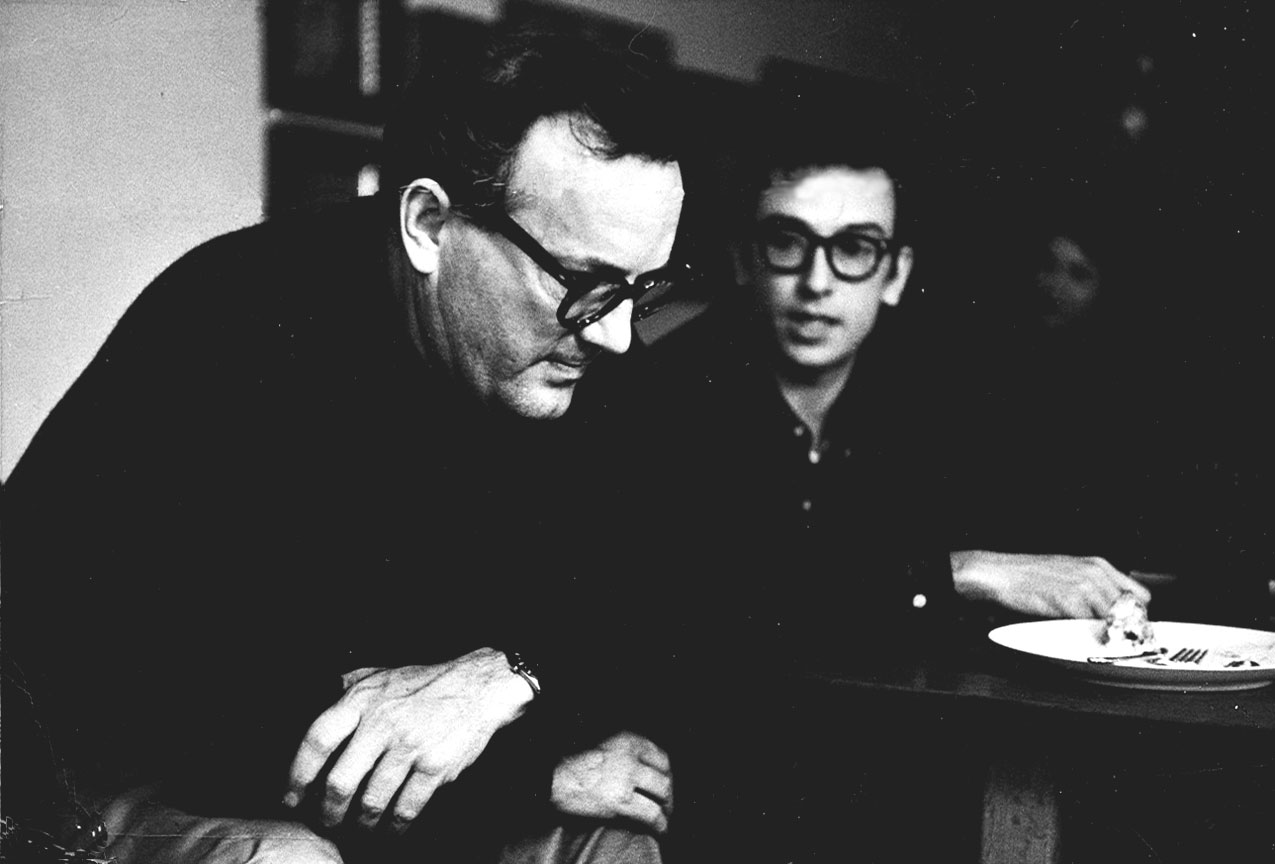
C. Wright Mills (left) and his assistant, Saul Landau (right)

The sociologist C. Wright Mills published his book The Power Elite in 1956, in which he claims to present a new sociological perspective on systems of power in the United States. He identifies a triumvirate of power groups—political, economic and military—which form a distinguishable, although not unified, power-wielding body in the United States.

Mills proposed that this group had been generated through a process of rationalisation at work in all advanced industrial societies whereby the mechanisms of power became concentrated, funneling overall control into the hands of a limited, somewhat corrupt group. This reflected a decline in politics as an arena for debate and relegation to a merely formal level of discourse. This macro-scale analysis sought to point out the degradation of democracy in "advanced" societies and the fact that power generally lies outside the boundaries of elected representatives.

==== Floyd Hunter ====
The elite theory analysis of power was also applied on the micro scale in community power studies such as that by Floyd Hunter (1953). Hunter examined in detail the power of relationships evident in his "Regional City" looking for the "real" holders of power rather than those in obvious official positions. He posits a structural-functional approach that mapped hierarchies and webs of interconnection within the city—mapping relationships of power between businessmen, politicians, clergy, etc. The study was promoted to debunk current concepts of any "democracy" present within urban politics and reaffirm the arguments for a true representative democracy. This type of analysis was also used in later, larger scale, studies such as that carried out by M. Schwartz examining the power structures within the sphere of the corporate elite in the United States.

==== G. William Domhoff ====
In his controversial book Who Rules America? (1967), G. William Domhoff researches local and national decision-making process networks, seeking to illustrate the power structure in the United States. He asserts, much like Hunter, that an elite class which owns and manages large income-producing properties (like banks and corporations) dominate the American power structure both politically and economically.

==== James Burnham ====
James Burnham's early work The Managerial Revolution sought to express the movement of all functional power into the hands of managers rather than politicians or businessmen—separating ownership and control.

==== Robert D. Putnam ====
Robert D. Putnam saw the development of technical and exclusive knowledge among administrators and other specialist groups as a mechanism that strips power from the democratic process and slips it to the advisors and specialists who influence the decision process.

"If the dominant figures of the past hundred years have been the entrepreneur, the businessman, and the industrial executive, the ‘new men’ are the scientists, the mathematicians, the economists, and the engineers of the new intellectual technology."

==== Ralf Dahrendorf ====
In his book Reflections on the Revolution in Europe, Ralf Dahrendorf asserts that, due to the advanced level of competence required for political activity, a political party tends to become, actually, a provider of "political services", that is, the administration of local and governmental public offices. During the electoral campaign, each party tries to convince voters it is the most suitable for managing the state's business. The logical consequence of this would be to acknowledge this character and to openly register the parties as service providing companies. In this way, the ruling class would include the members and associates of legally acknowledged companies and the "class that is ruled" would select, by election, the state administration company that best fits its interests.

==== Martin Gilens and Benjamin I. Page ====
In their statistical analysis of 1,779 policy issues, the professors Martin Gilens and Benjamin Page found that "economic elites and organized groups representing business interests have substantial independent impacts on U.S. government policy, while average citizens and mass-based interest groups have little or no independent influence." Critics cited by Vox argued, using the same dataset, that when the rich and the middle class disagreed, the rich got their preferred outcome 53 per cent of the time and the middle class got what they wanted 47 per cent of the time. Some critics disagree with Gilens and Pages' headline conclusion, but do believe that the dataset confirms that "the rich and middle (class) are effective at blocking policies that the poor want".

==== Thomas Ferguson ====
The political scientist Thomas Ferguson's book Investment Theory of Party Competition can be thought of as an elite theory. Set out most extensively in his 1995 book, Golden Rule: The Investment Theory of Party Competition and the Logic of Money-driven Political Systems, the theory begins by noting that in modern political systems the cost of acquiring political awareness is so great that no citizen can afford it.

==== Neema Parvini ====
Neema Parvini's book The Populist Delusion was an Amazon best-seller and has been influential in both Britain and America in explaining the failures of the populist waves created by Brexit and Donald Trump in creating real or lasting change. Parvini has become one of the most widely know modern proponents of elite theory owing to his international reach and large audience.

== See also ==
- Democratic deficit
- Elite analysis
- Elitism
- Iron law of oligarchy
- Mass society
- Positive political theory
- The Power Elite
- Ruling class
- Liberal elite
- Invisible Class Empire
- Dictatorship of the bourgeoisie

== Bibliography ==
- Amsden, Alice (2012) The Role of Elites in Economic Development, Oxford University Press, 2012. with Alisa Di Caprio and James A. Robinson.
- Bottomore, T. (1993) Elites and Society (2nd Edition). London: Routledge.
- Burnham, J. (1960) The Managerial Revolution. Bloomington: Indiana University Press.
- Crockett, Norman L. ed. The power elite in America (1970), excerpts from experts online free
- Domhoff. G. William (1967–2009) Who Rules America? McGraw-Hill. online 5th edition
  - Domhoff, G. William. Studying the power elite: Fifty years of who rules America? (Routledge, 2017); new essays by 12 experts
- Downey, Liam, et al. "Power, hegemony, and world society theory: A critical evaluation." Socius 6 (2020): 2378023120920059 online.
- Dye, T. R. (2000) Top Down Policymaking New York: Chatham House Publishers.
- Gonzalez, G. A. (2012) Energy and Empire: The Politics of Nuclear and Solar Power in the United States. Albany: State University of New York Press
- Gonzalez, G. A. (2009) Urban Sprawl, Global Warming, and the Empire of Capital. Albany: State University of New York Press
- Gonzalez, G. A. (2006) The Politics of Air Pollution: Urban Growth, Ecological Modernization, And Symbolic Inclusion. Albany: State University of New York Press
- Gonzalez, G. A. (2001) Corporate Power and the Environment. Rowman & Littlefield Publishers
- Hunter, Floyd (1953) Community Power Structure: A Study of Decision Makers.
- Lerner, R., A. K. Nagai, S. Rothman (1996) American Elites. New Haven CT: Yale University Press
- Milch, Jan, (1992). C. Wright Mills och hans sociologiska vision Om hans syn på makt och metod och vetenskap. Sociologiska Institutionen, Göteborgs Universitet ("C. Wright Mills and his sociological vision About his views on power and methodology and science. Department of Sociology, University of Gothenburg")
- Mills, C. Wright (1956) The Power Elite. online
- Neumann, Franz Leopold (1944). Behemoth: The Structure and Practice of National Socialism, 1933 - 1944. Harper. online
- Parvini, Neema (2022). The Populist Delusion. Perth:Imperium Press.
- Putnam, R. D. (1976) The Comparative Study of Political Elites. New Jersey: Prentice Hall.
- Putnam, R. D. (1977) ‘Elite Transformation in Advance Industrial Societies: An Empirical Assessment of the Theory of Technocracy’ in Comparative Political Studies Vol. 10, No. 3, pp383–411.
- Schwartz, M. (ed.) (1987) The Structure of Power in America: The Corporate Elite as a Ruling Class. New York: Holmes & Meier.
- Volpe, G. (2021) Italian Elitism and the Reshaping of Democracy in the United States. Abingdon, Oxon; New York: Routledge.
