= Iron law of oligarchy =

Political theory developed by Robert Michels

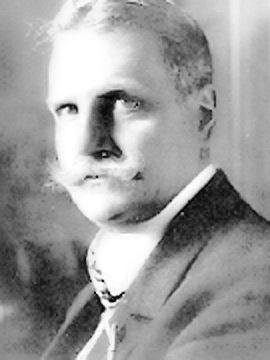
Robert Michels, the sociologist who devised the iron law of oligarchy

The iron law of oligarchy is a political theory first developed by the German-born Italian sociologist Robert Michels in his 1911 book Political Parties. It asserts that rule by an elite, or oligarchy, is inevitable as an "iron law" within any democratic organization as part of the "tactical and technical necessities" of the organization.

Michels's theory states that all complex organizations, regardless of how democratic they are when started, eventually develop into oligarchies. Michels observed that since no sufficiently large and complex organization can function purely as a direct democracy, power within an organization will always be delegated to individuals within that group, elected or otherwise. As he put it in Political Parties, "It is organization which gives dominion of the elected over the electors. [...] Who says organization, says oligarchy."

According to Michels, all organizations eventually come to be run by a leadership class who often function as paid administrators, executives, spokespersons, or political strategists for the organization. Far from being servants of the masses, Michels argues, this leadership class, rather than the organization's membership, will inevitably grow to dominate the organization's power structures.

All of these mechanisms can be used to strongly influence the outcome of any decisions made "democratically" by members. In 1911, using anecdotes from the histories of political parties and trade unions struggling to operate democratically, Michels applied his argument to representative democracy at large. He believed that "[h]istorical evolution mocks all the prophylactic measures that have been adopted for the prevention of oligarchy."

== History ==
In 1911, Robert Michels argued that the socialist parties of Europe, despite their democratic ideology and provisions for mass participation, seemed to be dominated by their leaders just like traditional conservative parties. Michels's conclusion was that the problem lay in the nature of organizations. The more liberal and democratic modern era allowed the formation of organizations with novel and revolutionary goals, but as such organizations become more complex, they became less and less democratic and revolutionary. Michels formulated the "iron law of oligarchy": "Who says organization, says oligarchy." He later became an important ideologue of Benito Mussolini's fascist regime in Italy, teaching economics at the University of Perugia.

== Reasons ==
Organization implies the tendency to oligarchy. In every organization, whether it be a political party, a professional union, or any other association of the kind, the aristocratic tendency manifests itself very clearly. The mechanism of the organization, while conferring a solidity of structure, induces serious changes in the organized mass, completely inverting the respective position of the leaders and the led. As a result of organization, every party of professional union becomes divided into a minority of directors and a majority of directed.

— Robert Michels

Michels stressed several factors that underlie the iron law of oligarchy. Darcy K. Leach summarized them briefly as: "Bureaucracy happens. If bureaucracy happens, power rises. Power corrupts." Any large organization, Michels pointed out, has to create a bureaucracy to maintain its efficiency as it becomes larger—many decisions have to be made daily that cannot be made by large numbers of disorganized people. For the organization to function, centralization has to occur and power will end up in the hands of a few. Those few—the oligarchy—will use all means necessary to preserve and further increase their power.

According to Michels, this process is further compounded as delegation is necessary in any large organization, as thousands—sometimes hundreds of thousands—of members cannot make decisions via participatory democracy. This has to date been dictated by the lack of technological means for large numbers of people to meet and debate, and also by matters related to crowd psychology, as Michels argued that people feel a need to be led. Delegation leads to specialization—to the development of knowledge bases, skills and resources among a leadership—which further alienates the leadership from the rank and file and entrenches the leadership in office. Michels also argued that for leaders in organizations, "The desire to dominate [...] is universal. These are elementary psychological facts." Thus, they were prone to seek power and dominance.

== Examples and exceptions ==
An example that Michels used in his book was Germany's Social Democratic Party.

=== Labour unions and Lipset's Union Democracy ===
One of the best known exceptions to the iron law of oligarchy is the now defunct International Typographical Union, described by Seymour Martin Lipset in his 1956 book, Union Democracy. Lipset suggests a number of factors that existed in the ITU that are supposedly responsible for countering this tendency toward bureaucratic oligarchy.

=== University student unions ===
Titus Gregory argues that university students' unions today "exhibit both oligarchical and democratic tendencies". Unlike trade unions they have an ideologically diverse membership, and frequently have competitive democratic elections covered by independent campus media who guard their independence. These factors are strongly democratizing influences, creating conditions similar to those described by Lipset about the ITU. However, Gregory argues student unions can also be highly undemocratic and oligarchical as a result of the transient membership of the students involved. Every year between one quarter and one half of the membership turns over, and Gregory argues this creates a situation where elected student leaders become dependent on student union staff for institutional memory and guidance. Since many students' unions extract compulsory fees from their transient membership, and many smaller colleges and/or commuter campus can extract this money with little accountability, oligarchical behaviour becomes encouraged. For example, Gregory points out how often student union election rules "operate under tyrannical rules and regulations" that are used frequently by those in power to disqualify or exclude would-be election challengers. Gregory concludes that students' unions can "resist the iron law of oligarchy" if they have "an engaged student community", an "independent student media", a "strong tradition of freedom of information", and an "unbiased elections authority" capable of administrating elections fairly.

=== Participatory subgroups and countervailing power ===
Jonathan Fox's 1992 study of Mexican peasant organizations focuses on how participatory subgroups within a membership organization can generate a degree of countervailing power that can at least temporarily mitigate the iron law of oligarchy.

=== Wikipedia ===
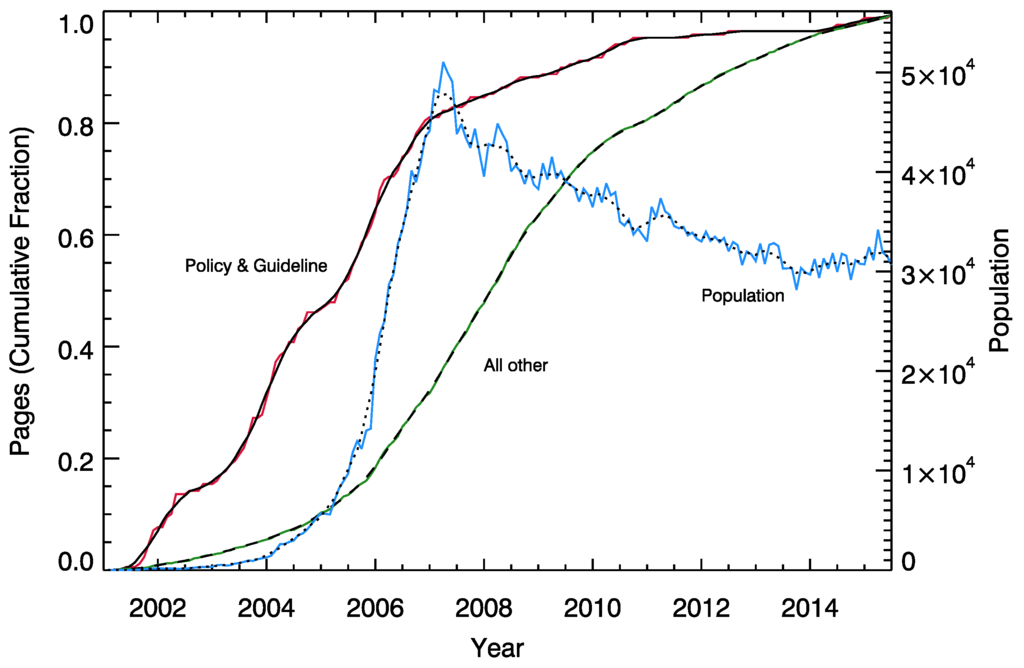
Cumulative growth in Wikipedia policy (red/solid line) and non-policy (green/dashed line) pages, overlaid on active population (blue/dotted line). Policy creation precedes the arrival of the majority of users, while the creation of non-policy pages, usually in the form of essay and commentary, lags the growth in population.

Research by Piotr Konieczny from 2009, a case study of the evolution of Wikipedia's policy on verifiability, argued that Wikipedia is not significantly affected by the iron law. A 2016 study by Bradi Heaberlin and Simon DeDeo concluded that the evolution of Wikipedia's network of norms over time is consistent with the iron law of oligarchy. Their quantitative analysis is based on data-mining over a decade of article and user information. It shows the emergence of an oligarchy derived from competencies in five significant "clusters", administration, article quality, collaboration, formatting, and content policy. Heaberlin and DeDeo note "The encyclopedia's core norms address universal principles, such as neutrality, verifiability, civility, and consensus. The ambiguity and interpretability of these abstract concepts may drive them to decouple from each other over time." Research on Decentralized Autonomous Organizations (DAO) and peer production platforms, including Wikipedia, also supports the applicability of the Iron Law.

== Reception ==
In 1954, Maurice Duverger expressed general agreement with Michels's thesis. In a 1953 study, C. W. Cassinelli argued that Michels's main thesis has "a high degree of general credibility", but argued that the statement of the theory was "inadequate" and that Michels's evidence for the theory was "inconclusive". In a 1966 article, political scientist Dankwart Rustow described Michels's thesis as "a brilliantly fallacious argument a fortiori". Rustow stated that the experience of the social democratic parties of Europe could not be generalized for other political parties. Josiah Ober argues in his 2008 book Democracy and Knowledge that the experience of ancient Athens shows Michels's argument does not hold true; Athens was a large participatory democracy, yet it outperformed its hierarchical rivals.

According to a 2000 article, "To the extent that contemporary scholars ask at all about social movement organizations, they tend to reinforce Michels's claim that bureaucratized, established organizations are more conservative in goals and tactics, though usually without explicitly engaging the iron law debate." The study however found that the iron law was malleable, and that established labor unions could under certain circumstances revitalize and experience radical change in line with its members' desires.

According to a 2005 study, "Despite almost a century of scholarly debate on this question ... there is still no consensus about whether and under what conditions Michels's claim holds true." One criticism is that power does not necessarily corrupt the leadership of organizations, and that the structure of organizations can check leaders. Another criticism is that Michels does not outline the conditions under which his thesis could be falsified nor a clear definition of what constitutes oligarchy.

Gabriel Almond wrote that Michels' use of the German Social Democratic Party as a case study to illustrate this "law" can be considered an example of the "crucial case study", that is "the most theoretically ambitious type of case study, involving the selection of a case least likely to support the theory", because there had been deliberate, institutional efforts made to democratize political control within the Party.

While influential, the theory has attracted substantial criticism: scholars note counterexamples of long-standing democratic organizations and highlight mechanisms – such as rotating leadership, participatory governance, checks and balances, and collective decision-making – that can resist oligarchization. Recent perspectives, such as Drochon (2020), interpret Michels's law dynamically, suggesting that democracy involves an ongoing contestation of elite dominance rather than a fixed state, while Diefenbach (2019) points to egalitarian models like worker cooperatives and non-hierarchical systems as viable alternatives. Nonetheless, Michels's thesis endures as a powerful analytical lens on the structural pressures that continually challenge the maintenance of democracy in complex organizations, underscoring the need for constant vigilance to prevent elite capture.

Michels's thesis became popular once more in the postwar United States with the publication of Union Democracy: The Internal Politics of the International Typographical Union (1956) by Lipset, Trow, and Coleman.

== 1984 ==
The iron law of oligarchy is similar to the concept in The Theory and Practice of Oligarchical Collectivism, a fictional book in the 1949 dystopian novel Nineteen Eighty-Four by George Orwell (who had also written a review of James Burnham's 1941 book The Managerial Revolution several years earlier). That fictional book begins:

Throughout recorded time, and probably since the end of the Neolithic Age, there have been three kinds of people in the world, the High, the Middle, and the Low. They have been subdivided in many ways, they have borne countless different names, and their relative numbers, as well as their attitude towards one another, have varied from age to age: but the essential structure of society has never altered. Even after enormous upheavals and seemingly irrevocable changes, the same pattern has always reasserted itself, just as a gyroscope will always return to equilibrium, however far it is pushed one way or the other.

== See also ==
- Elite theory
- Iron triangle (US politics)
- Plato's five regimes
- Post-democracy
