= Invisible Class Empire =

The Invisible Class Empire is a term introduced by Robert Perrucci and Earl Wysong in their book titled, The New Class Society: Goodbye American Dream? The term refers to members of the superclass that are involved in shaping both political and corporate policies. This class of people may be thought of as an empire because members maintain an influence on society through access to a surplus of financial, cultural, human and social capital. These various forms of capital translate into the political force needed to preserve classwide vested interests. Unlike conspiracy theories of power and control, the superclass' political influence is evidenced in the reality of economic and political inequalities that maintain class hierarchies. The term, therefore, refers to "the hidden structures and processes through which superclass leaders, along with their credentialed-class allies, penetrate and dominate the American political system." The empire is "invisible" because many of the individuals involved receive very little or no public attention.

== Social inequality and stratification ==
Citing Perrucci and Wysong, Christopher Doob explores the obscure networks and agencies that are embedded in policy-making processes. He explains that there is little public awareness of the structures that buttress the superclass' social dominance. Foundations, think tanks, universities and policy-making groups are all heavily influenced by superclass initiatives, and are part of the "widely dispersed collection of resources, organizations, and process" that form "a coherent political force that ensures the perpetuation of its [the superclass'] interests."

Members of the invisible class empire are able to dominate social systems in that they both fund and function within the policy-making groups.The policy-making groups are the associations who prepare the imperative political and economic policies. There are three major groups: the Business Roundtable (BR), the Council on Foreign Relations (CFR) and the Committee for Economic Development (CED). All three groups are essential for leading “major corporations, banks, law firms, important government officials, and prominent people from universities, foundations and the mass media.”

=== Global politics and hegemony ===
Sociologist, Charles Wright Mills determined that there is an "inner core" of the power elite involving individuals that are able to move from one seat of institutional power to another. They therefore have a wide range of knowledge and interests in many influential organizations, and are, as Mills describes, "professional go-betweens of economic, political, and military affairs." Relentless expansion of capitalism and the globalizing of economic and military power binds leaders of the power elite into complex relationships with nation states that generate global-scale class divisions. Theorist and Sociologist, Manuel Castells, writes in The Rise of the Network Society that contemporary globalization does not mean that "everything in the global economy is global." So, a global economy becomes characterized by fundamental social inequalities with respect to "the level of integration, competitive potential and share of the benefits from economic growth." Castells cites a kind of "double movement" where on one hand, "valuable segments of territories and people" become "linked in the global networks of value making and wealth appropriation," while, on the other, "everything and everyone" that is not valued by established networks gets "switched off... and ultimately discarded.". The wide-ranging effects of global capitalism ultimately affect everyone on the planet as economies around the world come to depend on the functioning of global financial markets, technologies, trade and labor.

== Identity and interlocking directorates ==
The leaders of the invisible class empire are sometimes referred to as the power elite in political and sociological theory. They are members of the superclass who control a disproportionate amount of wealth or political power. This power is used to influence corporate officers, attorneys, lobbyists, and politicians. Members of these groups, led by the superclass elite, come together to form the interlocking directorates that manage political and economic policy-making, as well as institutional hierarchies that help maintain the class empire. Their class-based power and political dominance are removed from public awareness by directing media propaganda, spin, and ideology; and also by precluding media coverage of their actions.

Although the influence of powerful groups and moguls is consistent with history, the magnitude, complexity and sophistication of this kind of influence on society is unprecedented. Perrucci and Wysong highlight four interlocking organizations that invest the invisible class empire with political power. They write:

Largely created, funded, and dominated by the superclass, this industry consists of four specialized, interrelated groups devoted to (1) federal lobbying – Washington, D.C.-area lobbying organizations funded largely by superclass-class-based resources to influence policy-making processes in Congress and federal agencies; (2) political finance – corporate-based individual wealth, political action committees (PACs), and 527 committees; (3) policy planning – think tanks, research institutes, policy discussion groups, and foundations; and (4) classwide lobbying – peak corporate groups and corporate-professional group coalitions

These are the resources that allow groups within the power elite to organize and advance agendas that subvert democratic ideals and functioning in order to dominate political arrangements. It requires a number of different collaborative projects to link superclass leaders and the class of experts and professionals that serve them. It is estimated that lobbying, political finance, and policy-planning services "consists largely of the top twenty thousand officers and directors located in the one thousand largest U.S. industrial, financial, and service firms." These top corporate office holders head the institutional power elite, and their firms shape the organizational base of power that maintains control over vast forms of capital.

== See also ==
- Elite theory
- Structural functionalism
- Social theory
- Superclass
- Power Elite
- Conflict theory
- Democracy
- Anarchism
