= Political class =

Small group highly active in politics

Political class (or political elite) is a concept in comparative political science, originally developed by Italian political theorist Gaetano Mosca (1858–1941). It refers to the relatively small group of activists that is highly aware and active in politics, and from whom the national leadership is largely drawn. As Max Weber noted, they not only live "for politics"—like the old notables used to—but make their careers "off politics" as policy specialists and experts on specific fields of public administration. Mosca approached the study of the political class by examining the mechanisms of reproduction and renewal of the ruling class; the characteristics of politicians; and the different forms of organisation developed in their wielding of power.

Elected legislatures may become dominated by subject-matter specialists, aided by permanent staffs, who become a political class.

== Comparative elites ==
The presence or absence of a political class in a country depends on its history. For example Germany (since 1945) has a very weak political class, with a "striking taboo" against the sort of elitism that dominated Germany before 1945, including the German Empire, the Weimar Republic, and Nazi Germany. In sharp contrast France has a very prestigious political class, which is trained in special elite schools.

=== Britain ===
Until the 1970s Britain featured a tight-knit political class that emerged from upper-class families whose sons came to know each other at elite "public schools" (like Eton College and Harrow School) and the "old boy" network, based on Oxford and Cambridge, which dominates public life. After 1970, however, the political class became much more open in terms of the social origins of British politicians and top civil servants. Conservative Members of Parliament (MPs) increasingly include those educated at non-elite schools and are of modest social backgrounds. Labour MPs, in turn, are increasingly middle class, white-collar and university educated. Still, the educational formation of British cabinet ministers has been dominated by a limited number of exclusive institutions at both post-primary and higher educational levels.

=== Spain ===
A political class emerged in Spain during the reign (1833–68) of Queen Isabella II. A modern political class emerged in Spain, adapted to the needs of a representative state that was under construction. To bring that about, the circles of power were open to intense renewal, coopting families of provincial gentry networks. The result was a political class composed mostly of jurists and attached to the values and interests of landed property. It was a new ruling class. Although originally inspired by revolutionary principles, it soon limited the circle of power, becoming aristocratic and largely closed to new membership.

=== Nigeria ===
Lucas (1998) examines despotic versus infrastructural power in terms of relations between the military leaders and the civilian political class in Nigeria from 1985 to 1993. He concludes that weak states experience a conflict between these two types of power. Despotic power, in sociologist Michael Mann's definition, refers to the state's repressive capacities, while infrastructural power refers to its ability to penetrate society and implement its decisions. Whereas leaders cultivate alliances with powerful social groups to realise their infrastructural power, the exercise of despotic power can undermine such patterns of collaboration.

Military leaders relied on a number of despotic strategies to extend their control over the political class as part of a promised transition to democracy: many politicians were banned, two government-created political parties were imposed, and elections that yielded outcomes threatening to military interests were annulled. While the military leadership was successful in repressing the politicians, it was unable to restructure the civilian leadership in ways that would further the institutional power of the state. The military's persistent reliance on despotic strategies led to a long-term decline in the integrity and infrastructural capacity of the state.

=== China ===
In China, the country was prevalently agricultural, dominated by an imperial bureaucracy that was crowned by the Mandarins. This was made up of judges, governors, administrators, all highly qualified in the art of governing. The literary official became the pillar of the political system.

== Populism ==
Populist political movements portray themselves as the enemies of the established political class and outsiders from the main political class that no longer represents the people and are morally corrupt. Such movements have included the United Kingdom’s United Kingdom Independence Party, France's National Front, Austria's Freedom Party and Belgium's Vlaams Belang.

=== United States ===
The term political class has recently been used as an epithet by conservatives, such as the editors of National Review. The theme is that the political elite is undemocratic and has an agenda of its own—especially the aggrandisement of its own power—that is hostile to the larger national interest, and which ought to be opposed by grassroots of populist movements.

There was a large movement for term limits in the United States in the 1990s to weaken the political class by limiting the number of terms an elected legislator could serve. Even though it succeeded in many states and cities it was rejected as unconstitutional by the U.S. Supreme Court when it tried to limit the number of terms that a federal officeholder could serve.

== See also ==
- Crony capitalism
- Elite
- Political corruption
- Power elite
- Ruling class
- The Establishment
