= Gaetano Mosca =

Italian political scientist and journalist

Gaetano Mosca COSML COCI SoK
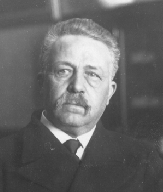

Member of the Italian Chamber of Deputies for Palermo
- In office 24 March 1909 – 29 September 1919
- Constituency: Caccamo

Personal details
- Born: 1 April 1858 Palermo, Kingdom of the Two Sicilies
- Died: 8 November 1941 (aged 83) Rome, Italy
- Party: Historical Right
- Education: University of Palermo
- Profession: Teacher, journalist

Philosophical work
- Era: 20th-century philosophy
- Region: Western philosophy
- School: Italian school of elitism
- Main interests: Politics, economics, sociology
- Notable ideas: Political class, political formula (a set of doctrines propagated by the ruling elites), elite theory

Gaetano Mosca COSML COCI SoK (Italian: [ɡaeˈtaːno ˈmoska]; 1 April 1858 – 8 November 1941) was an Italian political scientist, journalist and public servant. He is credited with developing the elite theory and the doctrine of the political class and is one of the three members constituting the Italian school of elitism together with Vilfredo Pareto and Robert Michels.

== Life ==
Mosca earned a degree in law from the University of Palermo in 1881. In 1887 he moved to Rome and took a position as editor of proceedings of the Chamber of Deputies of Italy. Having taught occasionally at Palermo and Rome, Mosca became chair of constitutional law at the University of Turin in 1896. He would hold this position until 1924, when he settled permanently in Rome to occupy the chair of public law at the University of Rome. Mosca held several other academic positions throughout his life.

He was skeptical towards democracy, and placed his lifelong liberalism in direct opposition to mass democracy. In a 1904 interview, he stated:

I can certainly call myself an anti-democrat, but I am not an anti-liberal; indeed I am opposed to pure democracy precisely because I am a liberal. I believe that the ruling class ought not to be monolithic and homogeneous but ought to consist of elements which are diverse in regard to origin and interests; when, instead, political power originates from a single source, even if this be elections with universal suffrage, I regard it as dangerous and liable to become oppressive. Democratic Jacobinism is an illiberal doctrine precisely because it subordinates everything to a single force, that of the so-called majority, on which it does not set any limits.

In 1909 Mosca was elected to the Chamber of Deputies of Italy, in which he served until 1919. During this time, he served as Under-secretary for the Colonies from 1914 until 1916. During this time, Mosca also worked as a political journalist for the Corriere della Sera of Milan (after 1901) and the Tribuna of Rome (from 1911 to 1921).

In 1919, Mosca was nominated life senator of the Kingdom of Italy. He served actively in this capacity until 1926. In 1925 he signed the Manifesto of the Anti-Fascist Intellectuals. On numerous occasions, the elderly Mosca took to the floor to speak against bills endorsed by Benito Mussolini which intended to curtail political rights and parliamentary institutions. Mosca explained his opposition to these bills not only by referring to his own faith in political liberties as values worth preserving, but also by appealing to the "development and progress" that accompanied those nations where political liberties had been safeguarded through representative institutions. Parliamentary regimes were able to protect civil and political liberties because they provided an independent source of authority through which to limit the power of the rulers. Mosca's speeches in support of civil liberties and parliamentary government, as well as his steadfast refusal to compromise with the fascist regime, exerted an important influence on members of the intellectual opposition to Mussolini's dictatorship such as Gaetano Salvemini and Piero Gobetti.

Mosca is most famous for his works of political theory. These were Sulla teorica dei governi e sul governo parlamentare (Theory of Governments and Parliamentary Government), published in 1884; Elementi di scienza politica (The Ruling Class), published in 1896; and Storia delle dottrine politiche (History of Political Doctrines), published in 1936.

== Political thought ==
Mosca's enduring contribution to political science is the observation that all but the most primitive societies are ruled in fact, if not in theory, by a numerical minority. He named this minority the political class. That means that every society could be split between two social classes: the one who rules and the one which is ruled. This is always true, for Mosca, because without a political class there is no rule.

Although his theory is correctly characterized as elitist, its basis is different from The Power Elite described, for example, by C. Wright Mills. Unlike Mills and later sociologists, Mosca aimed at developing a universal theory of political society. His more general theory of the Political Class reflects this aim.

Mosca defined modern elites in term of their superior organisational skills. These skills are especially useful in gaining political power in modern bureaucratic society. Nevertheless, Mosca's theory was more liberal than the elitist theory of Pareto, for example. In Mosca's view, elites are not always hereditary, as peoples from all classes of society can theoretically become elite. When this happens, the reproduction of power is defined as democratic; in contrast, when the members' turnover remains inside the elite, the reproduction of power is defined as aristocratic. He also adhered to the concept of the circulation of elites, a dialectical theory of constant competition among elites, with different elite groups alternating with each other repeatedly over time. This concept originated from his materialist idea of history as a conflict between classes (Marx), from the conflictual nature of politics considered as a fight for acquisition and deployment of power (Machiavelli), and finally from the non-egalitarian, hierarchical structure of society. Unlike Marx, Mosca has not a narrow concept of historical time, but a circular one, as in classical political theory, which consists in a perpetual condition of conflict and recycling of the elite. For Mosca, the dichotomous structure of society would not be solved by a revolution.

== Works in English translation ==
- Chisholm, George Goudie; Mosca, Gaetano; Ashby, Thomas (1911). "Sicily" . In Chisholm, Hugh (ed.). Encyclopædia Britannica. Vol. 25 (11th ed.). Cambridge University Press. pp. 20–35.
- The Ruling Class, (Elementi di Scienza Politica, 1896), McGraw-Hill Book Company, Inc., 1939.
  - "On the Ruling Class." In Talcott Parsons, ed., Theories of Society; Foundations of Modern Sociological Theory, Vol. I, Part Two, The Free Press of Glencoe, 1961.
- What is Mafia (Che cosa è la mafia, 1900), M&J, 2014.
  - New edition What Is the Mafia?, Perth, Australia, Imperium Press, 2025, 223 p.
- A Short History of Political Philosophy (Storia delle dottrine politiche, 1937), S. Z. Koff, Tran.; [1st American ed.], Crowell, 1972.
  - New translation : History of Political Ideas, Perth, Australia, Imperium Press, 2026, 338 p.
