= 2003 anti-WEF protests in Switzerland =

Fabrice Coffrini, AP Photo/Keystone. Click to enlarge: "sheriff" is clearly readable.

The World Economic Forum in Davos, Switzerland (January, 2003) triggered anti-globalization protests across Switzerland. Access to the town of Davos was blocked by the police of Grisons, with reinforcements from other cantons, and even Austrian police, which was unprecedented. On Saturday January 25, the day scheduled for a protest march in Davos, only selected protesters were allowed to pass.

In the afternoon, some of the protesters that were turned away outside Davos travelled to Bern, where the demonstrations quickly degenerated into full-scale riots, with thirty arrested and three policemen injured. The police prevented the protesters from entering the historical center of the city. The director of the Bernese police, Kurt Wasserfallen, referred to the events as "terrorism".

Meanwhile, the protesters who were allowed to enter Davos demonstrated peacefully, securely cordoned off from the WEF participants. One group appeared in monkey costumes, wearing masks of various world leaders, 'adoring' a golden calf that they carried around with them. Between bursts of adoration, they bashed an inflatable globe with plastic clubs. Osama bin Laden was portrayed as raping the planet in unison with George W. Bush and Donald Rumsfeld.

In a picture of the protests, a protester wearing a mask of Donald Rumsfeld and a yellow, six-pointed cardboard "sheriff" badge is portrayed carrying the golden calf, and next to him, another protester impersonating Ariel Sharon is wielding a plastic club. The Rumsfeld character's badge was misinterpreted as alluding to the Star of David, or even to Nazi concentration camp badges, an interpretation that arose because low-resolution versions of the image were circulated in news reports, where the "sheriff" text on the star was not legible.
