= Robert Michels =

German-Italian sociologist (1876–1936)

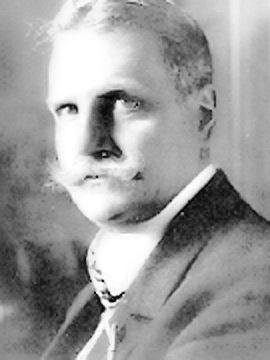
- Born: 9 January 1876; Cologne, German Empire
- Died: 3 May 1936 (aged 60); Rome, Fascist Italy

Academic background
- Influences: Le Bon; Sorel; Pareto; Mosca; Loria; Sombart; Weber

Academic work
- School or tradition: Italian school of elitism
- Institutions: University of Marburg; University of Perugia; University of Turin; University of Basel
- Notable works: Political Parties (1911)
- Notable ideas: Iron law of oligarchy Moderation theory
- Influenced: Bryce; Burnham; Duverger; McKenzie; Lipset; Neumann; Moldbug
- Political party: Social Democratic Party of Germany (–1907); National Fascist Party (1924–1936)

Robert Michels (German: [ˈmɪçl̩s]; 9 January 1876 – 3 May 1936) was a German-born Italian sociologist who contributed to elite theory by describing the political behavior of intellectual elites. He belonged to the Italian school of elitism. He is known best for his book Political Parties, published in 1911, which contains a description of the "iron law of oligarchy".

Michels was a friend and disciple of Max Weber, Werner Sombart, and Achille Loria. Politically, he transitioned from the Social Democratic Party of Germany to the Italian Socialist Party, endorsing the Italian revolutionary syndicalist group and later Italian fascism. His ideas provided the basis of moderation theory, which specifies the processes by which radical political groups are incorporated into an existing political system.

== Early life and education ==
Michels was born to a wealthy German family in Cologne, Germany on January 9, 1876. He studied in England, Paris (at the Sorbonne), and at universities in Munich, Leipzig (1897), Halle (1898), and Turin. He became a socialist while teaching at the Protestant Marburg University and became active in the Social Democratic Party of Germany, running as an unsuccessful candidate in the 1903 German federal election. In Italy, he associated with Italian revolutionary syndicalism, an anarchist branch of the Italian Socialist Party (PSI). He left both parties in 1907.

== Career ==
Michels achieved international recognition for his historical and sociological study, Zur Soziologie des Parteiwesens in der modernen Demokratie. Untersuchungen über die oligarchischen Tendenzen des Gruppenlebens, which was published in 1911; its title in English is Political Parties: A Sociological Study of the Oligarchical Tendencies of Modern Democracy. In it, he presented his theory of the "iron law of oligarchy" that political parties, including those considered socialist, cannot be democratic because they quickly transform themselves into bureaucratic oligarchies.

Michels delivered a paper, "Eugenics in Party Organization", at the First International Eugenics Congress (1912). He was considered a brilliant pupil of Max Weber, who in 1906 began publishing Michels' writings in the Archiv für Sozialwissenschaft und Sozialpolitik and in 1913 named him co-editor. However, they disagreed over Michels' opposition to World War I.

Michels criticized what he perceived to be Karl Marx's materialistic determinism. Michels borrowed from Werner Sombart's historical methods. Because Michels admired Italian culture and was prominent in the social sciences, he was brought to the attention of Luigi Einaudi and Achille Loria. They succeeded in procuring for Michels a professorship at the University of Turin in 1907, where he taught economics, political science, and socioeconomics until 1914. He then became professor of economics at the University of Basel, Switzerland, a posting he had until 1928. He also taught at the University of Messina in 1921.

In Italy, Michels studied the elite theory writings of Vilfredo Pareto. After 1911, he abandoned gradually his socialist ideas. In 1924, he joined the National Fascist Party led by Benito Mussolini. There are different interpretations among scholars for this change. One interpretation is that Michels as a disillusioned idealist considered fascism as an alternative to the problems of democracy and bureaucracy. Another interpretation is that Michels incorporated elite theory into his own political thought and began to consider the charismatic authority (as proclaimed by Max Weber) as the most logical hope to avoid bureaucratic domination.

In 1928, Michels became professor of economics and the history of doctrines at the University of Perugia, and occasionally lectured in Rome. He caught an illness in Bordeaux and died soon thereafter in Rome on May 3, 1936.

== Writings ==
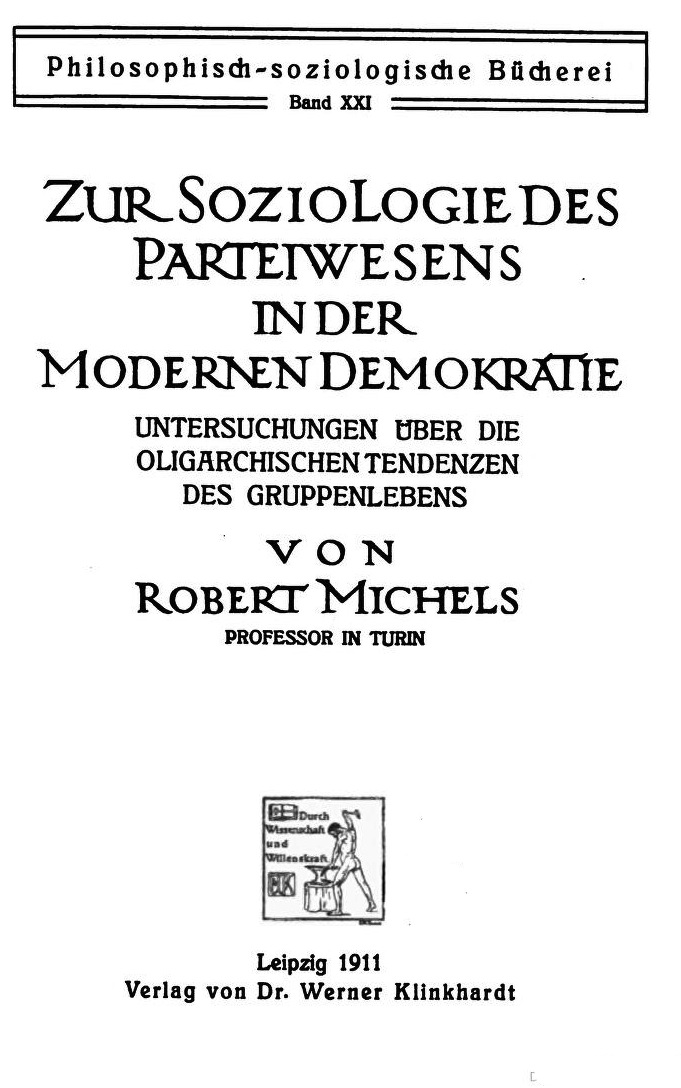

- Syndicalisme & socialisme en Allemagne (Unionism & Socialism in Germany) (1908)
- Proletariato e la borghesia nel movimento socialista italiano (The Proletariat and the Bourgeoisie in the Italian Socialist Movement) (1908; 1975)
- Zur Soziologie des Parteiwesens in der modernen Demokratie. Untersuchungen über die oligarchischen Tendenzen des Gruppenlebens (On the Sociology of the Oligarchical Tendencies of Modern Democracy) (1911, 1925; 1970). Translated, as Sociologia del partito politico nella democrazia moderna : studi sulle tendenze oligarchiche degli aggregati politici, from the German original by Dr. Alfredo Polledro, revised and expanded (1912). Translated, from the Italian, by Eden and Cedar Paul as Political Parties: A Sociological Study of the Oligarchical Tendencies of Modern Democracy (Hearst's International Library Co., 1915; Free Press, 1949; Dover Publications, 1959); republished with an introduction by Seymour Martin Lipset (Crowell-Collier, 1962; Transaction Publishers, 1999, ISBN 0-7658-0469-7); online at archive.org; translated into French by S. Jankélévitch, Les partis politiques. Essai sur les tendances oligarchiques des démocraties, Brussels, Editions de l'Université de Bruxelles, 2009 (ISBN 978-2-8004-1443-0).
- Grenzen der Geschlechtsmoral (Boundaries of Sexual Ethics). Italian translation, Morale sessuale revised and expanded by Alfredo Polledro (Fratelli Bocca, 19-?). Translated as Sexual Ethics: A Study of Borderland Questions (Walter Scott, George Allen & Unwin, Charles Scribner's Sons, 1914); republished with a new introduction by Terry R. Kandal (Transaction Publishers, 2001-2, ISBN 0-7658-0743-2)
- Probleme der Sozialphilosophie (Problems of Social Philosophy) (1914)
- Imperialismo italiano, studi politico-demografici (Italian Imperialism: Political and Demographic Studies) (1914)
- Amour et chasteté; essais sociologiques (Love and Chastity: Sociological Essays) (1914)
- Organizzazione del commercio estero (The Organization of Foreign Trade) (1925)
- Sozialismus und Faschismus in Italien (Socialism and Fascism in Italy) (1925)
- Storia critica del movimento socialista italiano : dagli inizi fino al 1911 (Critical history of the Italian socialist movement) (La Voce, 1926)
- Corso di sociologia politica (First lectures in political sociology) (1927). Translated, and introduced by Alfred de Grazia, as First lectures in political sociology (University of Minnesota Press, 1949; Arno Press, 1974, ISBN 0-405-05515-3)
- Sittlichkeit in Ziffern? Kritik der Moralstatistik (Morality in Numerics? Criticism of Morale Statistics) (1928)
- Patriotismus, Prolegomena zu seiner soziologischen Analyse (Patriotism, Prolegomena to his sociological analysis) (1929)
- Einfluss der faschistischen Arbeitsverfassung auf die Weltwirtschaft (Influence of the Fascist Arbeitsverfassung on the World Economy) (1929)
- Italien von heute. Politische und wirtschaftliche Kulturgeschichte von 1860 bis 1930 (Italy Today - Political and Economical Cultural History from 1860 to 1930) (1930)
- Introduzione alla storia delle dottrine economiche e politiche (Introduction to the history of economic and political doctrines) (1932)
- Umschichtungen in den herrschenden Klassen nach dem Kriege (1934)
- Boicottaggio, saggio su un aspetto delle crisi (Boycotts, an essay on an aspect of crises) (1934)
- Boycottage international (International boycotts) (1936)
- Verelendungstheorie. Studien und Untersuchungen zur internationalen Dogmengeschichte der Volkswirtschaft, with a foreword by Heinz Maus (Pauperization Theory - Studies and Research into International Dogmas History of National Economy) (1970)
- Elite e/o democrazia (Elites and/or democracy) (G. Volpe, 1972)
- Antologia di scritti sociologici (Anthology of publications on sociology); edited by Giordano Sivini (1980)
- Works on paper, 1918-1930 (Barbara Mathes Gallery, 1984)
- Critique du socialisme : contribution aux débats du début du XXè siècle (Critique of Socialism: contributions to the debates at the start of the 20th century); articles selected and presented by Pierre Cours-Salies and Jean-Marie Vincent (Editions Kimé, 1992, ISBN 2-908212-43-9)
