= Sigmund Neumann =

German political scientist and sociologist

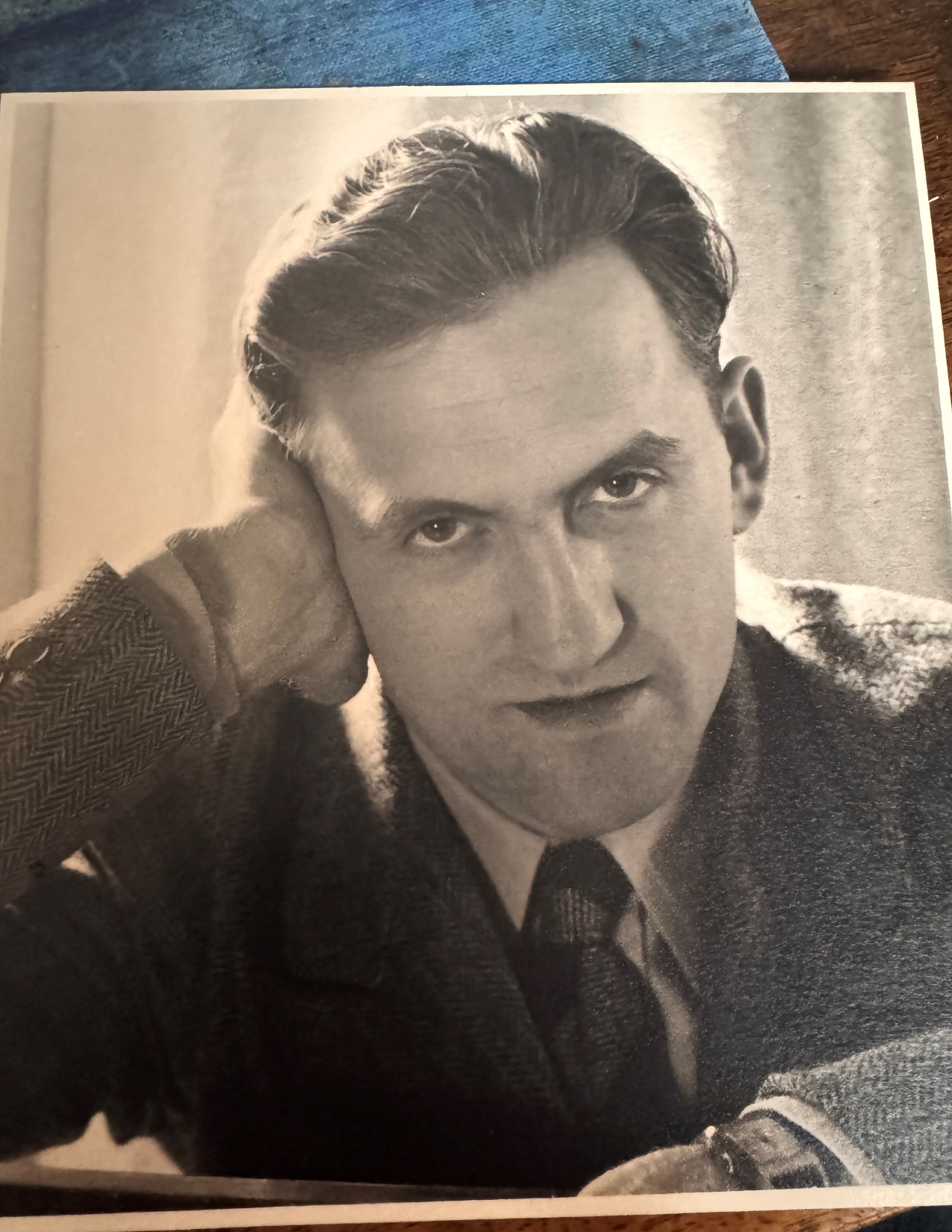
- Sigmund Neumann, c. 1930s
- Born: 1 May 1904; Leipzig, German Empire
- Died: 22 October 1962 (aged 58); Middletown, Connecticut, U.S.
- Occupations: Political Scientist, Scholar, Humanitarian Sociologist, Professor of Political Science
- Spouse: Anna Kuritzkes
- Children: Eva Jane Neumann

Academic background
- Influences: Robert Michels

Academic work
- Institutions: Columbia University; Harvard University; Wesleyan University; Deutsche Hochschule für Politik; London School of Economics

Sigmund Neumann (May 1, 1904 – October 22, 1962), born in Leipzig, Germany, was a Political Scientist, Scholar, Humanitarian Sociologist, Professor of Political Science, and member of the Hochschule für Politik in Berlin, Germany (1930–1933). He married Anna Kuritzkes in 1929, with whom he fathered his daughter, the psychoanalyst Eva Jane Neumann, on May 13, 1935.

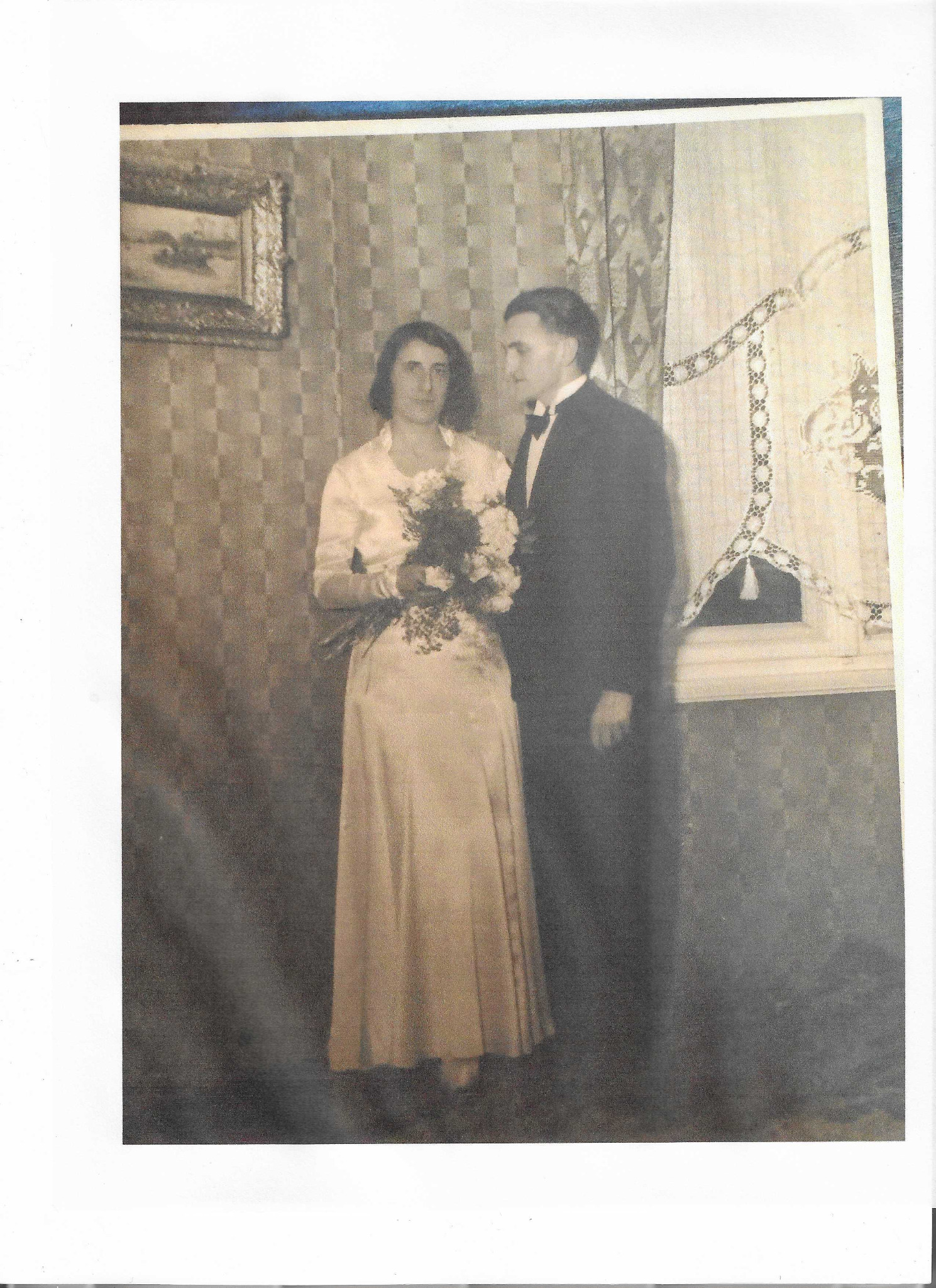
Sigmund Neumann with Anna (Kuritzkes) Neumann on their wedding day

In 1932 Neumann wrote his first book, Die Parteien der Weimarer Republik (“The Parties of the Weimar Republic”). Following Adolf Hitler’s decrees against Jewish intellectuals, lawyers, and writers, Neumann emigrated first to London, where he taught at the London School of Economics (1933–1934), then to the United States. In 1935, he secured a visa through NBC broadcaster Edward Morrow. This connection also resulted in his being invited to teach at Wesleyan University in May 1934. During his tenure at Wesleyan, Neumann served as Lecturer of Government & Social Science (1935–1962), as well as Professor of Government (1944–1962).

A gifted scholar of government and politics, Neumann was the author of many books. He published the groundbreaking Permanent Revolution: A Total State of War, the first of his works to be published in English, in 1942. The definitions of authoritarianism, fascism, and totalitarianism were among the first in the world to be analyzed and explained. In 1946, he wrote The Future in Perspective, in which he explored the Second Thirty Years' War perspective on World War I and World War II. He co-authored Introduction to the History of Sociology (1948) and was the editor of Modern Political Parties: Approaches to Comparative Politics. Edited by Sigmund Neumann. With Contributions by Frederick C. Barghoorn, Samuel H. Beer, Gwendolen M. Carter, Andrew Gyorgy, Charles A. Micaud, Sigmund Neumann, Felix E. Oppenheim, Dankwart A. Rustow, Robert A. Scalapino, and E. E. Schattschneider. (Chicago: The University of Chicago Press, in 1956.

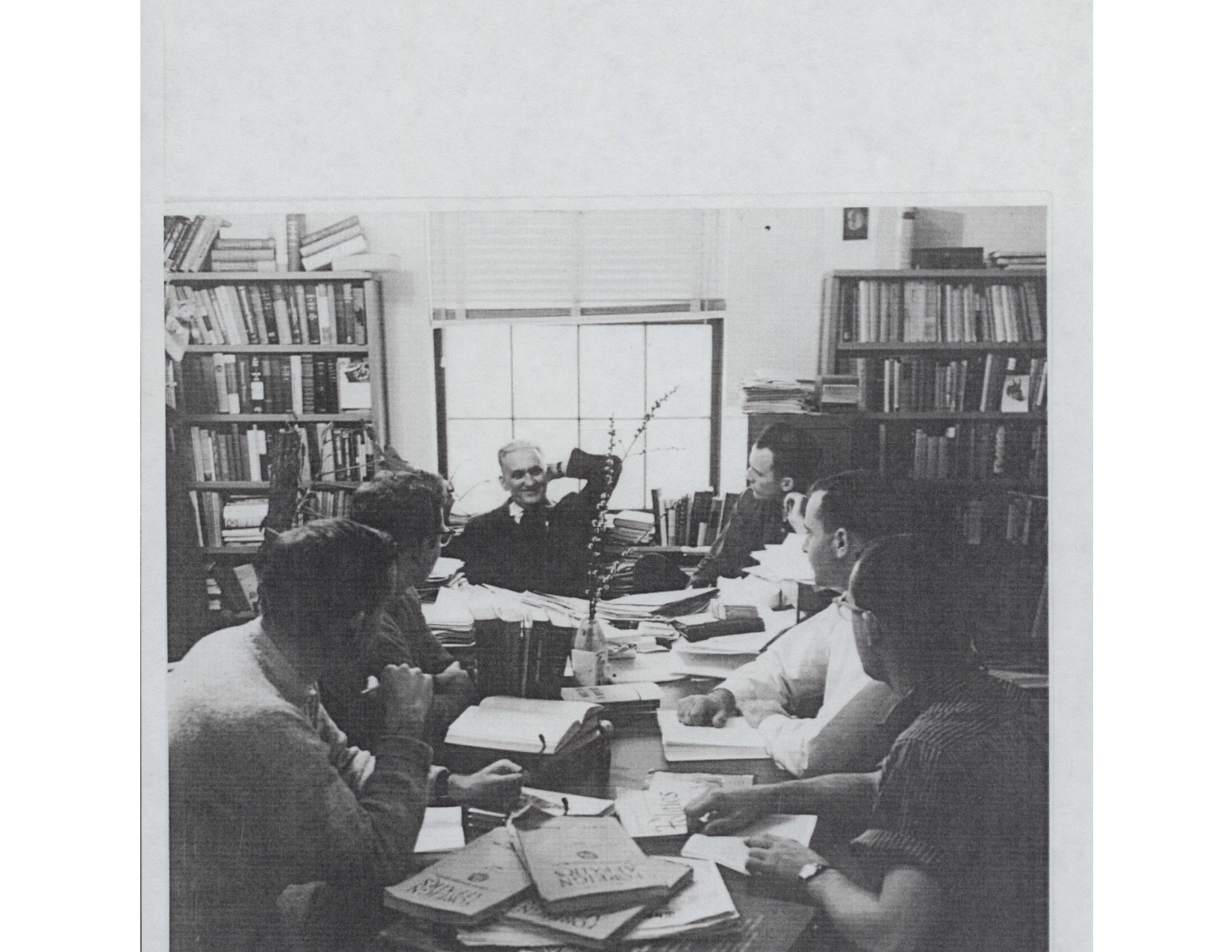
Neumann with students at Wesleyan University

In addition to his teaching and research, he served as director of the Center for Advanced Studies (now the Center for Humanities) (1959–1962), restarted and supervised the Wesleyan Press Archives in the Public Affairs Center (beginning in 1958), and became a mentor to many students, including Hannah Arendt in the 1950s. He also worked as a visiting professor at Amherst, Columbia, Harvard, Mount Holyoke, Princeton, Tufts, and Yale.

Aside from his writing, Neumann contributed directly to politics. He served as consultant to the U.S. Office of Strategic Services (1942–1945) and, upon his return to Germany in 1947, was involved with the Marshall Plan, helping to establish a democratic West German government. He was awarded honorary doctorates by both the Ludwig-Maximilians-Universität München and the Friedrich Wilhelm University of Berlin following his return to Germany in 1949.

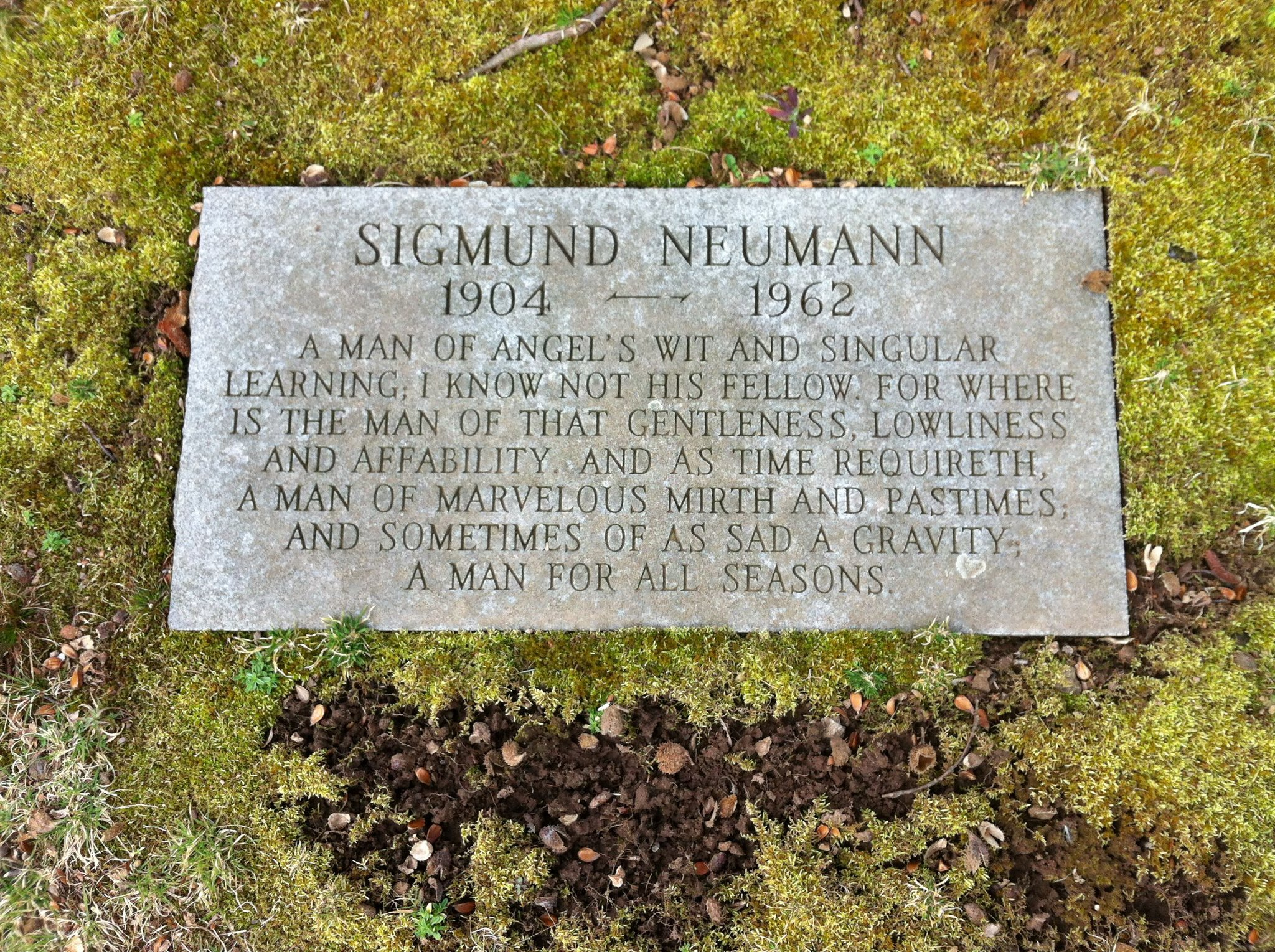
Sigmund Neumann's headstone in Indian Hill Cemetery

== Death ==
Neumann died peacefully in Middletown, CT on October 22, 1962, and is buried in Wunne Wah Jet, or Indian Hill Cemetery, with a headstone that reads:

A man of angel's wit and singular learning;
I know not his fellow.
For where is the man of that gentleness, lowliness and affability.
And as time requireth, a man of marvelous mirth and pastimes;
And sometimes of as sad a gravity;
A man for all seasons.

== Notes ==
- Peter Lösche (1999). "Neumann, Sigmund". Neue Deutsche Biographie (in German). Vol. 19. Berlin: Duncker & Humblot. pp. 161–162.
