= G. William Domhoff =

American professor (born 1936)

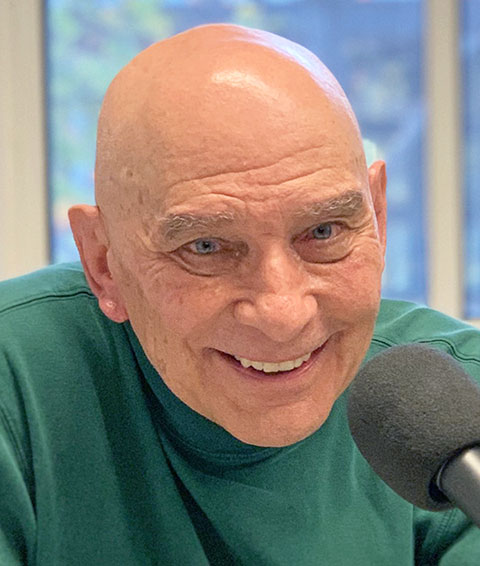
- Born: August 6, 1936 (age 90); Youngstown, Ohio, US
- Education: Duke University (BA Psychology, 1958); Kent State University (MA Psychology, 1959); University of Miami (PhD Psychology, 1962)
- Known for: Who Rules America?
- Scientific career
- Fields: Psychology; sociology
- Workplaces: University of California, Santa Cruz (1965-1994)

George William "Bill" Domhoff (born August 6, 1936) is an American psychologist and sociologist who is Distinguished Professor Emeritus and research professor of psychology and sociology at the University of California, Santa Cruz, and a founding faculty member of UCSC's Cowell College.

Domhoff is the author of Who Rules America? (1967), a widely cited analysis of political and economic power in the United States that has appeared in eight editions and has been used extensively in sociology courses.

== Early life and education ==
Domhoff was born in Youngstown, Ohio, and raised in Rocky River, a suburb of Cleveland. In high school, Domhoff was a three-sport athlete (in baseball, basketball, and football), wrote for his school newspaper's sports section, served on student council, and won a contest to be the batboy for the Cleveland Indians. He graduated as co-valedictorian.

Domhoff received a Bachelor of Arts degree in psychology at Duke University (1958), where he finished freshman year tenth in his class, wrote for the Duke Chronicle, played baseball as an outfielder, and tutored the student athletes. As an undergraduate, he also wrote for The Durham Sun and received his Phi Beta Kappa key. He later earned a Master of Arts degree in psychology at Kent State University (1959), and a Doctor of Philosophy degree in psychology at the University of Miami (1962).

== Career ==
Domhoff was an assistant professor of psychology at California State University, Los Angeles, from 1962 to 1965. In 1965, he joined the founding faculty of the University of California, Santa Cruz (UCSC), as an assistant professor at Cowell College, where he was affiliated with both the Department of Psychology and the Department of Sociology . He became an associate professor in 1969, a professor in 1976, and a Distinguished Professor in 1993. After his retirement in 1994, he continued to publish and teach classes as a research professor until 2019. Since 2020 he has focused on research and writing, along with invited lectures.

During his tenure at UCSC, he served in a number of leadership roles, including chair of the Sociology Department, chair of the Academic Senate, acting dean of the Division of Social Sciences, and chair of several university and statewide committees. In 2007, he received the Constantine Panunzio Distinguished Emeriti Award from the University of California, recognizing sustained post‑retirement scholarly contributions. In 2024, he was awarded a Edward A. Dickson Emeritus Professorship, which provided financial support for his research in the 2024-2025 academic year.

== Research and scholarship ==
=== Power structure research ===
Domhoff's early work focused on the study of elite networks, corporate power, and governance in the United States. His first book, Who Rules America?, argued that a relatively cohesive corporate‑based power elite plays a central role in shaping policy through control of major corporations, policy‑planning organizations, foundations, and think tanks.

The book built on earlier elite theorists such as C. Wright Mills, E. Digby Baltzell, and Floyd Hunter, and contributed to ongoing debates between elite theory and pluralist theory in political sociology. Subsequent editions updated the analysis to reflect changes in party politics, corporate organization, and policy‑planning networks. Domhoff later extended this line of research through archival and network‑based studies of corporations, foundations, and policy‑planning groups, as well as collaborative work on class, race, gender, and elite recruitment. His work has been discussed in sociology reference works, peer‑reviewed journals, and teaching literature. Four of his books were on the list of the top 50 "best sellers" in sociology for the years 1950-1995: Who Rules America? (1967, #12); The Higher Circles (1970, #39); The Powers That Be (1979, #47); and Who Rules America Now? (1983, #43).

Who Rules was followed by a series of sociology and power structure books including C. Wright Mills and the Power Elite (1968), Bohemian Grove and Other Retreats (1974), The Higher Circles (1970), The Powers That Be (1979), and Who Rules America Now? (1983). Domhoff and his research assistant, Adam Schneider, maintain a website dedicated to power structure research, WhoRulesAmerica.net.

=== Dream research and psychology ===
Beginning in the 1960s, Domhoff collaborated with psychologist Calvin S. Hall on the quantitative analysis of dream content. He later became a leading proponent of treating dreams as a form of imaginative cognitive activity that is continuous with waking thought rather than as symbolic expressions requiring clinical interpretation.

Domhoff's later work developed the neurocognitive theory of dreaming, which integrates dream content analysis with findings from developmental psychology, lesion studies, and functional neuroimaging. According to this theory, dreaming depends on the activation of portions of the brain's default network and related systems, while higher‑order executive networks are relatively deactivated. Dreaming is said to be an intensified form of mind-wandering and daydreaming, which by now have been shown to be very similar in many ways to dreaming.

Most recently, he published Dreams, Sleep, and Consciousness in April, 2026, which interweaves his neurocognitive theory of dreaming with a new theory of sleep, developed by a sleep researcher, and a new theory of consciousness, developed by a psychologist who studied emotions for several decades before turning to the issue of consciousness. The new theory of sleep, the adaptive inactivity theory of sleep, explains why all mammals sleep in varying amounts, and best explains why dreaming occurs during the sleep-onset process, in the several REM periods during the night, and in the NREM 2 (N2) sleep that occurs in the 1-1.5 hours before the spontaneous morning awakening. The new theory of consciousness, the multistate hierarchical model of consciousness, makes it possible to explain how and why fact-knowing ("noetic") dreaming consciousness differs from self-knowing ("autonoetic") waking consciousness.

In psychology and cognitive science, Domhoff's work on dreams is frequently cited in journals including Dreaming, Consciousness and Cognition, and Frontiers in Human Neuroscience, and is discussed in handbooks and monographs on imagination and consciousness.. His 2022 book on The Neurocognitive Theory of Dreaming won the American Association of Publishers' 2023 PROSE Award for the best book relevant to the "Clinical Psychology and Psychiatry" category.

He and his research assistant, Adam Schneider, maintain two websites dedicated to quantitative dream research: DreamResearch.net and DreamBank.net.

== Selected bibliography ==
=== Who Rules America? ===
- 1967. Who Rules America? Englewood Cliffs, New Jersey: Prentice Hall.
- 1970. The higher circles. New York: Random House.
- 1978. Who really rules? New Haven and community power re-examined. New Brunswick: Transaction Books
- 1990. The power elite and the state: How policy is made in America. Hawthorne, NY: Aldine de Gruyter.
- 2011.Class and power in the New Deal: Corporate moderates, Southern Democrats, and the liberal-labor coalition. Palo Alto: Stanford University Press. (With Michael J. Webber).
- 2013 The myth of liberal ascendancy: Corporate dominance from the Great Depression to the Great Recession. Boulder: Paradigm Publishers.
- 2020. The corporate rich and the power elite in the twentieth century: How they won, why liberals and labor lost. New York: Taylor & Francis.
- 2022. Who Rules America? The Corporate Rich, White Nationalist Republicans, and Inclusionary Democrats in the 2020s. 8th Edition. Abingdon, UK: Routledge.

=== Dreams ===
- 1996. Finding Meaning in Dreams: A Quantitative Approach. New York: Plenum Publishing.
- 2003. The Scientific Study of Dreams: Neural Networks, Cognitive Development, and Content Analysis. Washington: American Psychological Association Press.
- 2022. The Neurocognitive Theory of Dreaming: The Where, How, When, What, and Why of Dreams. Cambridge, MA: MIT Press.
- 2026. Dreams, Sleep, and Consciousness: Interweaving the Neurocognitive Theory of Dreaming with New Theories of Sleep and Consciousness. New York: Routledge.
