= Who Rules America? =

1967 book by G. William Domhoff

- Cover of first edition
- Author: G. William Domhoff, Ph.D.
- Publisher: Prentice-Hall
- Publication date: 1967
- Publication place: United States
- Pages: 288 pp
- OCLC: 256506
- Followed by: Who Rules America Now? (1983); Who Rules America? Power and Politics in the Year 2000 (1998); Who Rules America? Power and Politics (2002); Who Rules America? Power, Politics, & Social Change (2006); Who Rules America? Challenges to Corporate and Class Dominance (2010); Who Rules America? The Triumph of the Corporate Rich (2014); Who Rules America? The Corporate Rich, White Nationalist Republicans, and Inclusionary Democrats in the 2020s (2022)

Who Rules America? is a book by research psychologist and sociologist G. William Domhoff, Ph.D., published in 1967 as a best-seller (#12).

WRA is frequently assigned as a sociology textbook, documenting the dangerous concentration of power and wealth in the American upper class. More recent editions have brought the discussion up to date, including the rise of Barack Obama, Donald Trump, and the trend toward nationalism in the Republican Party.

== Summary ==
Domhoff argues in the book(s) that a power elite wields power in America transparently through its support of think tanks, foundations, commissions, and academic departments. Additionally, he argues that the elite controls institutions through overt authority, not through covert influence.

In his introduction, Domhoff writes that the book was inspired by the work of four previous researchers: sociologists E. Digby Baltzell, C. Wright Mills, economist Paul Sweezy, and political scientist Robert A. Dahl.

The University of California, Santa Cruz hosts Domhoff's Who Rules America? web site.

== Publication history ==
The original edition was followed by seven subsequent editions:

- Who Rules America Now? (1983)
- Who Rules America? Power and Politics in the Year 2000 (1998)
- Who Rules America? Power and Politics (2002)
- Who Rules America? Power, Politics, & Social Change (2006)
- Who Rules America? Challenges to Corporate and Class Dominance (2010)
- Who Rules America? The Triumph of the Corporate Rich (2014)
- Studying the Power Elite: Fifty Years of Who Rules America (2017)
- Who Rules America? The Corporate Rich, White Nationalist Republicans, and Inclusionary Democrats in the 2020s (2022)
