= Cedar Paul =

British singer, author, translator and journalist (1880–1972)

Cedar Paul, née Gertrude Mary Davenport (1880 – 18 March 1972) was a singer, author, translator and journalist.

== Biography ==
Gertrude Davenport came from a musical family: her mother was Clarina Thalia Macfarren (1848-1934), daughter of the composer George Alexander Macfarren, and her father was the composer Francis William Davenport (1847–1925). She was educated at convent schools in Belgium, France, Italy and England, and studied music in Germany.

She was a member of the Independent Labour Party from 1912 to 1919, and Secretary of the British Section of the Women's International Council of Socialist and Labour Organizations from 1917 to 1919. She married Eden Paul, and from 1915 onwards was active - under the name of Cedar Paul - as a translator and writer in collaboration with her husband. The pair became members of the Communist Party of Great Britain, and Cedar served on the executive committee of the Plebs League in the 1920s. Together with Lyster Jameson, the Pauls made "strenuous attempts [...] to develop psychology" as a component of working-class education in the Plebs League. However, some working-class League members resented them:

In the labour colleges [...] there was considerable resentment against the middle-class intellectuals who came into the Plebs League during and immediately after the war. Two books written by Eden and Cedar Paul, Creative Revolution (1920) and Proletcult (1921), attracted criticism for their obscure vocabulary - they coined words like 'ergatocracy' to replace the ugly 'dictatorship of the proletariat' - and generally school marmish tone

The Pauls were prolific translators in the interwar years, translating a range of socialist and psychotherapy works, as well as novels, particularly historical novels. They were the official translators for Stefan Zweig and Emil Ludwig, and their other translations from German included works by Karl Marx, Rudolf Hilferding, Karl Jaspers, Rudolf Brunngraber, and Heinrich von Treitschke. However, they also translated work from French, Italian (including a work by Robert Michels) and Russian (including works by Joseph Stalin, and Georgi Plekhanov, and Mikhail Lermontov's A Hero of Our Time).

After Eden Paul's death in 1944, Cedar Paul published only a small number of translations under her own name. She found herself in serious debt and experienced dire poverty, living in a caravan.

== Works ==
=== Translations undertaken with Eden Paul ===
- History of Germany in the nineteenth century by Heinrich von Treitschke, 1915–19. Translated from the German.
- Political parties; a sociological study of the oligarchical tendencies of modern democracy by Robert Michels. New York, Hearst's International Library Co., 1915. Translated from the Italian.
- The twentieth century Molière: Bernard Shaw by Augustin Frédéric Hamon. London: G. Allen & Unwin, 1915. Translated from the French.
- The diary of a French private, war-imprisonment, 1914-1915 by Gaston Riou. London: G. Allen & Unwin, 1916. Translated from the French.
- The sexual crisis: a critique of our sex life by Grete Meisel-Hess. New York: Critic and Guide Co., 1917. Translated from the German.
- Heredity, disease and human evolution by Hugo Ribbert. New York: Critic and Guide Co., 1918. Translated from the German.
- Boehm-Bawerk's Criticism of Marx by Rudolf Hilferding. Glasgow : Socialist Labour Press, [1919.] Translated from the German.
- The spirit of Russia : studies in history, literature and philosophy by T. G. Masaryk. London : Allen & Unwin; New York : Macmillan, 1919. Translated from the German. 2 vols.
- Suggestion and autosuggestion : a psychological and pedagogical study based upon the investigations made by the new Nancy School by Charles Baudouin. London: George Allen & Unwin Ltd, 1920. Translated from the French.
- A new school in Belgium by A. Faria de Vasconcellos, with an introduction by Adolphe Ferrière. London: G. G. Harrap & Co., 1919. Translated from the French.
- Karl Marx by Achille Loria. London, G. Allen & Unwin Ltd., 1920. Translated from the Italian.
- The Forerunners by Romain Rolland. New York: Brace & Howe, 1920. Translated from the French Les Précurseurs (1919).
- The industrial development of Palestine by Nahum Wilbuschewitsch. [London]: Trade and Industry Dept. of the Central Bureau of the Zionist Organisation (London), 1920. Translated from the German.
- A young girl's diary (anon., prefaced with a letter by Sigmund Freud). New York: T. Seltzer, 1921. Translated from the German Tagebuch eines halbwüchsigen Mädchens.
- Psychoanalysis and sociology by Aurel Kolnai. London: George Allen & Unwin, 1921.
- Letters from prison: with a portrait and a facsimile by Rosa Luxemburg. Berlin : Pub. House of the Young International, ©1921, t.p. 1923. Translated from the German.
- In Days to Come by Walther Rathenau. London: G. Allen & Unwin Ltd., 1921. Translated from the German.
- Casanova's homecoming by Arthur Schnitzler. New York: Private printing for subscribers only, 1921. 1,250 copies printed. Translated from the German.
- Romain Rolland; the man and his work by Stefan Zweig. New York, T. Seltzer, 1921. Translated from the original manuscript.
- Studies in psychoanalysis; an account of twenty-seven concrete cases preceded by a theoretical exposition. Comprising lectures delivered in Geneva at the Jean Jacques Rousseau institute and at the Faculty of letters in the university by Charles Baudouin. New York: Dodd, Mead and Co., 1922. Translated from the French.
- The ABC of Communism: a popular explanation of the program of the Communist Party of Russia by Nikolai Bukharin and Yevgeni Preobrazhensky. [S.l.] : Communist Party of Great Britain, 1922. Translated from the Russian.
- The restoration of agriculture in the famine area of Russia: being the interim report of the State Economic Planning Commission of the Council for Labour and Defence of the Russian Socialist Federal Soviet Republic. London: Labour Publishing Co., 1922. Translated from the Russian.
- Psychoanalysis and sociology by Aurel Kolnai. New York: Harcourt, Brace and Co., 1922. Translated from the German Psychoanalyse und Soziologie. Zur Psychologie von Masse und Gesellschaft (1920).
- History of Switzerland, 1499-1914 by Wilhelm Oechsli. Cambridge University Press, 1922. Translated from the German.
- Jeremiah, a drama in nine scenes by Stefan Zweig. New York: T. Seltzer, 1922. Translated from the author's revised German text.
- Through dictatorship to democracy by Klara Zetkin. Glasgow : Socialist Labour Press, [ca. 1922]. Translated from the German.
- The power within us by Charles Baudouin. New York: Dodd, Mead and Co., 1923. Translated from the French
- Vitamins; a critical survey of the theory of accessory food factors by Ragnar Berg. New York: A.A. Knopf, 1923. Translated from the German.
- The dominant sex; a study in the sociology of sex differentiation by Mathilde and Mathias Vaerting. New York, George H. Doran Co., [1923]. Translated from the German Weibliche Eigenart im Männerstaat und die männliche Eigenart im Frauenstaat.
- Contemporary studies by Charles Baudouin. London: G. Allen & Unwin Ltd., [1924]. Translated from the French.
- Psychoanalysis and aesthetics by Charles Baudouin. New York: Dodd, Mead, 1924. Translated from the French Le Symbole Chez Verhaeren.
- The inner discipline by Charles Baudouin and Alexandre Lestchinsky. New York: Holt, 1924. Translated from the French.
- The new theories of matter and the atom by Alfred Berthoud. London: G. Allen & Unwin; New York: Macmillan, [1924]. Translated from the French.
- Labour's alternative: the United States of Europe or Europe limited by Edo Fimmen. London, Labour Pub. Co., 1924. Translated from the German.
- Love in children and its aberrations; a book for parents and teachers by Oskar Pfister. New York: Dodd, Mead and Company, 1924. Translated from the German.
- The remaking of Russia by Kurt Wiedenfeld. London: Labour Pub. Co., 1924. Translated from the German.
- Sigmund Freud, his personality, his teaching, & his school by Fritz Wittels. London: G. Allen & Unwin, [1924]. Translated from the German.
- Passion and pain by Stefan Zweig. London, Chapman and Hall, 1924. Translated from the German.
- Psychological healing: a historical and clinical study by Pierre Janet. London: G. Allen & Unwin; New York: Macmillan, [1925]. 2 vols. Translated from the French Médications psychologiques
- By airplane towards the North pole; an account of an expedition to Spitzbergen in the summer of 1923 by Walter Mittelholzer. London: G. Allen & Unwin Ltd., [1925]. Translated from the German.
- An end to poverty by Fritz Wittels. London: G. Allen & Unwin, 1925. Translated from the German Die vernichtung der not
- Napoléon by Emil Ludwig. New York, N.Y. : Boni & Liveright, 1926. Translated from the German.
- The eighteenth Brumaire of Louis Bonaparte by Karl Marx. London: G. Allen & Unwin, [1926]. Translated from the German.
- Red money: a statement of the facts relating to the money raised in Russia during the general strike and mining lock-out in Britain by All-Russian Council of Trade Unions. London: Labour Research Dept., 1926.
- Napoleon and his women friends by Gertrude Aretz. Philadelphia: J. B. Lippincott Co., 1927.
- Women and love by Bernhard Bauer. New York: Boni & Liveright, 1927. 2 vols. Translated from the German.
- The psychology of socialism by Hendrik de Man. New York: H. Holt and Co. [1927]. Translated from the second German edition.
- Bismarck; the story of a fighter by Emil Ludwig. Boston: Little, Brown and Co., 1927. Translated from the German.
- Night: a drama in five acts by Marcel Martinet. London: C.W. Daniel, 1927. Translated from the French.
- Karl Marx, man, thinker, and revolutionist; a symposium by David Riazanov. London: M. Lawrence, [1927]. Translated from the German and the Russian.
- Conflicts: three tales by Stefan Zweig. New York: The Viking Press, 1927. Translated from the German.
- Trenck, the love story of a favourite by Bruno Frank. New York: A.A. Knopf, 1928. Translated from the German.
- The Son of man: the story of Jesus by Emil Ludwig. New York: Boni & Liveright, 1928. Translated from the German.
- Capital, by Karl Marx. London: Allen & Unwin, 1928. Translated from the 4th German edition of Das Kapital.
- Leninism by Joseph Stalin. London: G. Allen & Unwin, [1928-33]. 2 vols. Translated from the Russian.
- History of the first International by Yuri Mikhailovich Steklov. London: M. Lawrence, [1928]. Translated from the 3rd Russian ed., with notes from the 4th ed.
- Adepts in self-portraiture: Casanova, Stendhal, Tolstoy by Stefan Zweig. New York: Viking Press, 1928. Translated from the German
- Master builders: an attempt at the typology of the spirit by Stefan Zweig. New York: Viking Press, 1928–1930. 2 vols. Translated from the German.
- Diana: a novel by Emil Ludwig. New York: Viking Press, 1929. Translated from the German.
- On Mediterranean shores by Emil Ludwig. London: G. Allen & Unwin, [1929]. Translated from the German.
- Joy in Work by Hendrik de Man. London, G. Allen & Unwin ltd. [1929]. Translated from the German Der Kampf um die Arbeitsfreude.
- Fundamental problems of Marxism by Georgi Plekhanov. London, M. Lawrence [1929]. Translated from Osnovnye voprosy marksizma, 2nd Russian ed. (Moscow, 1928).
- Karl Marx: his Life and Work by Otto Rühle. New York: The Viking press, 1929. Translated from the German.
- The wife of Steffen Tromholt by Hermann Sudermann. New York : H. Liveright, 1929. Translated from the German Die Frau des Steffen Tromholt.
- Lincoln by Emil Ludwig. Boston: Little, Brown and Co., 1930. Translated from the German.
- The Communist Manifesto by Karl Marx, with an introduction and explanatory notes by D. Ryazanoff [pseud.]. London : Martin Lawrence, [1930]. Text of the Manifesto translated from the German; remainder translated from the revised (1922) edition of Ryazanoff's The communist manifesto (in Russian).
- Types of economic theory by Othmar Spann. London : G. Allen & Unwin ltd., [1930]. Translated from the 19th German ed. Also published as The history of economics, New York: W. W. Norton & Company, Inc.
- Economic trends in Soviet Russia by Aaron Yugow. London : G. Allen & Unwin, 1930. Translated from the German Die Volkswirtschaft der Sowjetunion und ihre Probleme, 1929, a translation by A. R. L. Gurland from the author's Russian ms.
- Joseph Fouché, the portrait of a politician by Stefan Zweig. New York: Viking Press, 1930. Translated from the German.
- Three Masters: Balzac, Dickens, Dostoeffsky by Stefan Zweig. London, 1930. Translated from the German.
- Human Heredity by Erwin Baur, Eugen Fischer, and Fritz Lenz. London: G. Allen & Unwin ltd.; New York: The Macmillan Company, [1931]. Translated from the German.
- The problem of genius by Wilhelm Lange-Eichbaum. London: K. Paul, Trench, Trubner & Co., 1931. Translated from the German Genieproblem. Eine Einführung.
- Men and forces of our time by Valeriu Marcu. New York: Viking Press, 1931. Translated from the German.
- Lassalle; the power of illusion and the illusion of power by Arno Schirokauer. London: G. Allen & Unwin Ltd., [1931]. Translated from the German.
- The conquest of old age: methods to effect rejuvenation and to increase functional activity by Peter Schmidt. London: G. Routledge, 1931. Translated from the German.
- Desuggestion for the attainment of health, happiness, and success by Edwin Tietjens. London: Allen & Unwin, [1931]. Translated from the 2nd German ed.
- Awakening Japan: the diary of a German doctor by Erwin Baelz (ed. by his son, Toku Baelz). New York : The Viking press, 1932. Translation from the German Erwin Bälz; das Leben eines deutschen Arztes im erwachenden Japan..
- Introduction to Sexual Hygiene by Abraham Buschke and Friedrich Jacobsohn. London: G. Routledge & Sons, 1932.
- Life of Mendel by Hugo Iltis.
- Talks with Mussolini by Emil Ludwig. London: George Allen & Unwin, 1932. Translated from the German Mussolinis Gespräche mit Emil Ludwig
- The birth of the nations : from the unity of faith to the democracy of money by Valeriu Marcu. London: G. Routledge, 1932.
- Red Russia by Theodore Seibert. New York : The Century company, [1932]. Translated from the 3rd German edition of Das rote Russland, Staat, Geist und Alltag der Bolschewiki.
- H. M. Stanley - explorer by Jakob Wassermann. London: Cassell & Co., 1932.
- Set the children free! by Fritz Wittels. London: G. Allen & Unwin, ltd., [1932]. Translated from the 4th German edition (1927) of Die befreiung des kindes, "specially revised and brought up to date by the author in 1932".
- Amok by Stefan Zweig. London: Cassell, 1932.
- The Mind of the Child. A psychoanalytical study by Charles Baudouin. London: G. Allen & Unwin, 1933.
- A Twentieth Century Tragedy by Rudolf Brunngraber. London: Lovat Dickson, 1933.
- The organism of the mind : an introduction to analytical psychotherapy by Gustav Richard Heyer. London: K. Paul, Trench, Trubner & co., ltd, 1933.
- Man in the Modern Age by Karl Jaspers. London: G. Routledge & Sons, 1933.
- Dark angel by Gina Kaus. London: Cassell, 1933.
- Great doctors: a biographical history of medicine by Henry E. Sigerist. London: G. Allen & Unwin, 1933.
- Genealogy of love by Curt Thesing. London: G. Routledge, 1933. Translated from the German Stammesgeschichte der Liebe.
- Bula Matari: Stanley, conqueror of a continent by Jakob Wassermann. New York, Liveright Inc., 1933
- Letter from an unknown woman by Stefan Zweig. London; Toronto: Cassell, 1933.
- Marie Antoinette, the portrait of an average woman by Stefan Zweig. New York: Viking Press, 1933. Translated from the German.
- Mental healers: Franz Anton Mesmer, Mary Baker Eddy, Sigmund Freud by Stefan Zweig. London: Cassell and Co., Ltd., 1933.
- Leopold the unloved : King of the Belgians and of money by Ludwig Bauer. London : Cassell, 1934. Translated from the German.
- Lovers in Galilee. An idyl of the time of Tiberius by Henry Dupuy-Mazuel. London: Hurst & Blackett, [1934.]
- Joseph Kerkhoven’s Third Existence. A novel by Carl Jacob Wassermann. London: G. Allen & Unwin, 1934.
- Erasmus of Rotterdam by Stefan Zweig. New York: Viking Press, 1934. Translated from the German.
- The new Cæsar: a novel by Alfred Neumann. London: Hutchinson & Co., 1934.
- Leaders, dreamers, and rebels. An account of the great mass-movements of history and of the wish-dreams that inspired them by René Fülöp-Miller. Translated from the German. New York: The Viking Press, 1935.
- Coffee : the epic of a commodity by Heinrich Eduard Jacob. New York: The Viking press, 1935. Translated from the German Sage und Siegeszug des Kaffees. English edition published as The saga of coffee: biography of a product.
- Hindenburg and the saga of the German revolution by Emil Ludwig. London, Toronto: W. Heinemann, Ltd., [1935]. Translated from the German.
- School of biology by Curt Thesing. London: G. Routledge & sons, ltd., 1935. Translated from the German.
- Mary, queen of Scotland and the Isles by Stefan Zweig. New York: Viking Press, 1935. Translated from the German.
- The Davos murders by Emil Ludwig. New York: Viking Press, 1936.
- Caesar's mantle; the end of the Roman republic by Ferdinand Mainzer. New York: Viking Press, 1936. Translated from the German.
- Divine adventurer: a novel by Karl August Meissinger. New York: Viking Press, 1936. Translated from the German Der Abenteurer Gottes.
- Tsushima by A. S. Novikov-Priboĭ. London: G. Allen & Unwin, 1936. Translated from the Russian.
- Arturo Toscanini by Paul Stefan. New York: Viking Press, 1936.
- The Right to Heresy. Castellio against Calvin by Stefan Zweig. London: Cassell & Co., 1936. Translated from the German Castellio gegen Calvin.
- Kerkhoven's third existence by Jakob Wassermann. New York: Liveright Pub. Corp., 1936.
- Radium: a novel by Rudolf Brunngraber. London: G. G. Harrap, 1937.
- Death from the skies: a study of gas and microbial warfare by Heinz Liepman with the scientific assistance of H. C. R. Simons. London: Secker & Warburg, 1937. Translated from the German. US edition published as Poison in the air, 1937.
- The gaudy empire: a novel by Alfred Neumann. New York: A. A. Knopf, 1937.
- Man of December: a story of Napoleon III and the fall of the Second Empire; a novel by Alfred Neumann. London: Hutchinson, 1937.
- Insulted and exiled: the truth about the German Jews by Arnold Zweig. London: John Mills, 1937. Translated from the German.
- The buried candelabrum by Stefan Zweig. New York: Viking Press, 1937. Translated from the German.
- Emperors, angels, and eunuchs: the thousand years of the Byzantine Empire by Berta Eckstein-Diener. London: Chatto & Windus, 1938. US edition published as Imperial Byzantium, 1938.
- Triumph over pain by René Fülöp-Miller. New York, Bobbs-Merrill Co., 1938. Translated from the German.
- Racism by Magnus Hirschfeld. London: Victor Gollancz, 1938. Edited and translated from the German.
- Jewish short-stories of today by Morris Kreitman. London: Faber & Faber, 1938.
- The mad queen of Spain by Michael Prawdin. London: G. Allen & Unwin, 1938. Translated from the German.
- Conqueror of the seas; the story of Magellan by Stefan Zweig. New York: Viking Press, 1938. Translated from the German.
- George Frederick Handel's resurrection. Auferstehung Georg Friedrich Händels by Stefan Zweig. [London: Corvinus press], 1938. German and English on opposite pages.
- Dmitri Donskoi: a novel by Sergei Borodin. London: Hutchinson's International Authors, [1940?]
- A hero of our own times by Mikhail Lermontov. London: G. Allen & Unwin, 1940.
- The Mongol empire, its rise and legacy by Michael Prawdin. London: G. Allen and Unwin, 1940.
- Technique of analytical psychotherapy by Wilhelm Stekel. New York: Norton, 1940.
- Germany tomorrow by Otto Strasser. London: Jonathan Cape, 1940. Translated from the German. (Incorporating a translation of 'Aufbau des deutschen Sozialismus.')
- The tide of fortune: twelve historical miniatures by Stefan Zweig. New York: Viking Press, 1940. Translated from the German.
- The coming of socialism by Lucien Deslinières. London: British Socialist Party, n.d. Translated from the French.
- Through dictatorship to democracy by Klara Zetkin. Glasgow : Socialist Labor Press, n.d. Translated from the German.

=== Other works ===
- (ed. with Eden Paul) Population and birth-control; a symposium. New York: Critic and Guide, 1917. With contributions by William J. Robinson, Achille Loria, Charles V. Drysdale, Ludwig Quessel, Eden Paul, Edward Bernstein, Binnie Dunlop, Rudolf Manschke, S. H. Halford and F. W. Stella Browne.
- (with Eden Paul) Independent working class education: thoughts and suggestions. London: Workers' Socialist Federation, 1918
- (with Eden Paul) Creative revolution, a study of communist ergatocracy. London: G. Allen and Unwin, 1920. (Translated into Japanese, alongside John Stuart Mill's The Subjection of Women and William Mellor's Direct Action, in 1929)
- (with Eden Paul) The appreciation of poetry. London: C.W. Daniel, 1920
- (with Eden Paul) Proletcult (proletarian culture). London: L. Parsons, [1921]. The New Era Series, vol. 12.
- (with Eden Paul) Communism. London: Labour Pub. Co., 1921. Labour booklets, no. 3.
- (with Eden Paul) Anti-Soviet forgeries; a record of some of the forged documents used at various times against the Soviet government. [London]: Workers' Publications, 1927
- (ed. with a biographical introduction, with Eden Paul) A Doctor's Views on Life by William J. Robinson. London: Allen & Unwin, 1927
- (with Eden Paul and Edward Conze, eds.) An outline of psychology by H. Lyster Jameson, 9th ed., completely revised, London : N.C.L.C., 1938. PLEBS outline number one.
- (tr.) Stepan Razin: a novel' by Aleksey Chapygin. London; New York: Hutchinson international authors, 1946. Translated from the Russian.
- (tr.) The captain by Alexey Novikov-Priboy. London; New York: Hutchinson International Authors, 1946. Translated from the Russian.
- (tr.) The fatal skin by Honoré de Balzac. London: Hamish Hamilton, 1949. Translated from the French La Peau de chagrin.
- (tr.) Where the Sun never set by Margarita de Planelles. [London]: Godfrey & Stephens.
