= Ludwig Bauer =

Ludwig Bauer may refer to:

- Ludwig Bauer (journalist) (1876–1935), Austro-Swiss journalist and peace activist
- Ludwig Bauer (officer) (1923–2020), German World War II tank commander
- Ludwig Bauer (soldier) (1912–1944), German World War II soldier
- Ludwig Bauer (novelist) (born 1941), Croatian writer, recipient of the Vladimir Nazor Award for literature

== See also ==
- Louis Bauer
