= Ragnar Berg =

Swedish biochemist

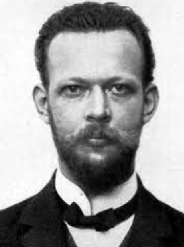
- Born: September 1, 1873; Gothenburg
- Died: March 31, 1956 (aged 82)
- Occupations: Biochemist, nutritionist

Ragnar Berg (September 1, 1873 – March 31, 1956) was a Swedish-born biochemist and nutritionist who worked most of his adult life in Germany. He is best known for his theories on the importance of acid-base balance and inorganic minerals like calcium in the diet; later in life he endorsed vegetarianism and ways to prolong the human life span. He promoted an alkaline rich diet and also invented the alkaline dietary supplement Basica, which Volkmar Klopfer manufactured and marketed from 1925.

== Biography ==
Ragnar Berg was the son of the respected Swedish historian and archaeologist Wilhelm Berg (1839-1915) and his first wife, Ulrika Charlotta Emerentia "Emy" Gumaelius (1846-1902). He married Ella Buscher in 1902, and they had two sons, Gunnar Wilhelm Emil (1907-1974) and Alf Ragnar Wilhelm (1912-1994).

Berg was recruited by Karl Lingner to the Dresden Center for Dental Hygiene (Zentralstelle für Zahnhygiene) in 1902, where he met dentist Carl Röse (1864–1947), his long-time experimental partner. From 1909 to 1921 Berg headed the physiology lab at the homeopathic sanatorium founded by Heinrich Lahmann at Weisser Hirsch near Dresden, researching vitamins, trace elements and the metabolism of minerals. A fire damaged the laboratory at the end of December 1914.

In 1921, he was dismissed from Lahmann's Sanatorium, since business had dried up during World War One, and its new directors wanted to focus on the more lucrative fields of psychoanalysis and gynecology. Historians have noted the dismissal occurred because the "directors did not value his scientific approach to nutrition." Berg continued conducting experiments on himself and analyzing foodstuffs from a home laboratory. From 1927 to 1932, he headed his own nutrition department at the Dresden-Friedrichstadt Hospital. In 1934, he became head of the nutrition department at the Rudolf Hess Hospital in Dresden. However, his funding ran out two years later. Only during the 1940s was he able to get federal funds for his "war-related" work. Berg belonged to the Nazi Party's Main Office for People's Health.

In March 1945, Berg and his wife, Ella, fled bombed-out Dresden for Berlin and then to Stockholm, Sweden. (Neither their house nor his lab in the hospital had been damaged, however.) They lived in his native Sweden until her death from a heart attack at the end of 1954. Berg was very lonely, his health deteriorated, and he spent many months in the hospital before moving to his son's home north of Hamburg, where he died a few months later of old age and metastatic prostate cancer. He was nearly blind by this time.

== Vitamins: A Critical Survey ==
Berg's most notable work was his book Vitamins: A Critical Survey of the Theory of Accessory Food Factors translated from the German by Cedar and Eden Paul, in 1923. The book has been cited as one of the earliest on vitamin research in Europe. It has a huge bibliography of 1500 entries.

A 1923 review in The British Medical Journal praised Berg for documenting scientific knowledge of vitamins and summarizing data from a huge mass of original literature but noted that some of his ideas about inorganic metabolism "have not met with general acceptance". In contrast, nutritionist Katharine H. Coward negatively reviewed the book, stating that "Berg is blinded by his own ideas and work on the importance of the inorganic salt content of a diet... Altogether it is a confused, and, in many cases, an inaccurate, account of the subject."

Although the term "vitamins" was included in the title of the book, Berg did not like this term. Instead, he used the term "complettins" which was criticized for confusing readers. Berg also coined the term "acomplettinoses" for vitamin deficiencies A, B and C.

== Theories ==
Berg and Carl Röse developed a theory of acid-base balance in the body that is affected by diet. They relied on the work of Ernst Leopold Salkowski, who published results in the 1870s that suggested inorganic acids could only be excreted by the kidneys if neutralized by inorganic bases. If the acids remained in the body, they would accumulate in areas of low blood flow (like joints), thereby obstructing normal physiological function. The model disease was gout, but Berg traced many other "diseases of civilization" to acid-base imbalance, including obesity, arthritis, and diabetes.

Because the body produces more acids than bases, concluded Berg, the best source of bases was the diet. If the diet was too acidic, then the body would break down proteins for the ammonia. This prevented the body from getting the full caloric and nitrogen value of the protein and produced abnormal intermediate metabolites. Moreover, a more basic diet reduced the need for protein. The following chart classifies foods according to Berg's theory and analyses.

Acidic foods	Basic foods
meat, eggs, grains, bread, butter and other fats, beer, nuts, seeds	milk, potatoes, most fruits, most vegetables, coffee, tea, cocoa, soy

Berg promoted an alkaline rich diet. His recommended diet consisted of 80% alkaline foods and 20% acidic foods. After World War I he turned his attention to popularizing his theory directly. His theory was not accepted by the medical community but was popular in the field of naturopathy. In the early 1930s Berg met Gayelord Hauser. They authored the book Dictionary of Foods, in 1932.

== Vegetarianism ==
In the 1930s and 1940s, Berg teamed up with Are Waerland to promote vegetarianism and ways to prolong life.

In 1933, at the meeting of the International Vegetarian Union (IVU) in Switzerland, Nazism was criticized. Berg was invited to participate at the IVU 1935 meeting in Denmark but he refused due to its anti-Nazi stance.

== Selected publications ==
- (with Martin Vogel) Die Grundlagen einer richtigen Ernährung, Dresden, 1907
- Der Einfluss des Abbrühens auf den Nährwert unserer Gemüsekost, Dresden, 1911
- Die Nahrungs- und Genussmittel, ihre zusammensetzung und ihr Einfluss auf die Gesundheit, mit besonderer Berücksichtigung der Aschenbestandteile, Dresden: Holze & Pahl, 1913
- Die Vitamine: kritische Übersicht der Lehre von den Ergänzungsstoffen, Leipzig: Hirzel, 1922.
  - Translated by Cedar and Eden Paul as Vitamins: A Critical Survey of the Theory of Accessory Food Factors. New York: A.A. Knopf, 1923.
- Eiweissbedarf und Mineralstoffwechsel bei einfachster Ernährung, Leipzig: S. Hirzel, 1931
- (with Gayelord Hauser) Dictionary of Foods, New York: Tempo Books, 1932
