= Red Russia =

Red Russia or Red Russian may refer to:

- Communism in Russia; in particular:
  - The Bolsheviks, party that seized power in Russia during the 1917 October Revolution
  - Russian Soviet Federative Socialist Republic (1917–91)
  - Winning side in the Russian Civil War (1917–23)
  - Soviet Union (1922–91), pars pro toto, the Russian SFSR being the predominant component of the union
- Red Ruthenia, a historical region of eastern Europe now split between Ukraine and Poland
- Red Russian (cocktail), vodka with either cherry liqueur or strawberry schnapps
- Red Russia, a 1907 book by John Foster Fraser
- Red Russia, a 1919 book by John Reed (journalist)
- Red Russia, a 1931 book by Theodor Seibert

== See also ==
- Soviet Russia (disambiguation)
- Russian Red, Spanish indie and folk singer-songwriter
