= Gertrude Aretz =

German historian and publisher

Gertrude Aretz (née Kuntze-Dolton; 1889–1938) was a German historian and publisher. She was married first to the historian Friedrich Max Kircheisen and later to the publisher Paul Aretz. In 1927 she edited the memoirs of Auguste Charlotte von Kielmannsegge (1777–1863).

== Works ==
- Die Frauen um Napoleon, München, Leipzig, G. Müller, 1912. Translated by Cedar and Eden Paul as Napoleon and his women friends 1927.
