= Frieda Wunderlich =

German sociologist, economist and politician

Dr. Frieda Wunderlich
- Born: Frieda Wunderlich; November 8, 1884; Charlottenburg, Berlin, German Empire
- Died: December 9, 1965 (aged 81); East Orange, New Jersey, U.S.
- Education: University of Berlin, University of Freiburg
- Occupations: Sociologist, Economist, Politician, Academic
- Relatives: Georg Wunderlich (brother), Eva Wunderlich (sister)
- Writing career
- Language: German, English
- Years active: 1914–1954
- Genres: Social Science, Political Science
- Subjects: Labor market, Women's rights, Social policy, Totalitarianism
- Notable works: Hugo Münsterberg's Bedeutung für die Nationalökonomie, numerous articles in Soziale Praxis
- Notable awards: Honorary doctorate from the University of Cologne (1955)
- Movements: Women's movement, Social reform movement

Frieda Wunderlich (8 November 1884 – 9 December 1965) was a German sociologist, economist and politician of the German Democratic Party. She was actively involved in the women's movement fighting for gender equality.

== Life and education ==
Frieda Wunderlich was born on 8 November 1884 in Charlottenburg, Berlin, the second child of the Jewish merchant David Wunderlich and his wife Rosa Ashkenazy. Her older brother, Georg Wunderlich, was a lawyer, and her younger sister, Eva Wunderlich, worked in the field of literature.

She received her secondary education at a German all-girls school and then, in 1901, started an apprenticeship at her father's business. In 1910, she completed the German Abitur, enabling her to go on to study economics and philosophy in Berlin and Freiburg. Wunderlich interrupted her studies during World War I and worked for the Nationaler Frauendienst (National Women's Work) and other war related organizations. She received her doctorate in 1919 from the University of Freiburg summa cum laude with a dissertation on the importance of Hugo Münsterberg for economics ("Hugo Münsterberg's Bedeutung für die Nationalökonomie").

== Work ==
In 1914, Wunderlich started teaching at a school for social work in Berlin, and at the academy for administration of the University of Berlin. She succeeded Ignaz Jastrow as publisher of the weekly journal Social Practice (Soziale Praxis) from 1923 until she emigrated in 1933. This journal was described as at the center of the social reform movement, highlighting Wunderlich's position within the movement and her importance for its success. During these years, she frequently wrote articles for Social Practice. She stressed international aspects of women's labour and women's employment protection. Wunderlich was also head of the Society for Social Reform (Gesellschaft für soziale Reform) in Germany, in which role she led a good part of the sociopolitical discussions in the Weimar Republic.

She also worked as judge at the highest court for national insurance in 1924–25. In 1930, she was promoted to professor for sociology and social politics at a public institute for vocational education studies in Berlin, the Staatliches Berufspädagogisches Institut in Berlin.

After Adolf Hitler and the Nazi Party came to power in 1933, Wunderlich was forced to retire from her position. She was among the 45% of Jewish academics who left Germany in 1933. Her plan to emigrate to Great Britain with the help of her contacts at the London School of Economics and Social Science failed. Instead, she accepted an invitation from the New School for Social Research in New York City and until 1954 worked as professor for political and social sciences on its graduate faculty. This faculty, known after 1933 as the University in Exile, was a rescue program for European academics. Wunderlich was the only woman among its ten founding members.

The academic staff at the New School concerned themselves with the question of why socio-political reforms had failed in Germany and why there was no noteworthy resistance movement. Wunderlich participated in this discussion through her lectures, like one titled "Freedom and Intellectual Responsibility" (1937) delivered at a colloquium opened by Thomas Mann and focused on educational systems in totalitarian states.

She thought that National Socialism and its totalitarian aspects substituted for religion, with the belief in the superiority of the German race as its central tenet. Thus rights are no longer based on human rights, the law of nature or the feeling of belonging to one nation, but derive instead from the feeling of belonging to a "mystic society bound by blood". This definition exceeds the meaning of nation as a political society and, according to her, implies the war on inferior races as well as a fight against liberal values such as equality, liberty and self-determination. She was convinced that National Socialism takes over the control of the cultural and social unity of the family, altering the role of women, who are left with their maternal and household management roles. She adds that not all employment positions were purged of women, but that they were to work in the lowest positions with the smallest income.

Wunderlich was one of few academics who emigrated and managed to continue to have a political career. Her colleagues elected her by a unanimous vote to serve as Dean of the New School's Graduate Faculty of Political and Social Science for the academic year 1939–40. The chairman of the faculty, Alvin Johnson, said:

Dr. Wunderlich's work in a succession of important educational and governmental positions in Germany prior to 1933 made her one of the first ranking women of that country. In contrast to the present status of women, which restricts them to the lower paid and less important positions, Dr. Wunderlich's career embodied far-sighted social policy based on scholarly training in economics, on experience in social work that began with the administration of a whole district during the World War, and on practical politics in both elective governmental posts and trade unions and other politically important groups.

She was the first women to be dean of a faculty in the United States. Apart from her involvement in the university, Wunderlich was from 1939 until 1943 the head of a research projects funded by the Rockefeller Foundation focusing on social and economic control in Germany and Russia.

In 1955, a year after her retirement, she received an honorary doctorate from the University of Cologne.

She died on 9 December 1965 in East Orange, New Jersey.

== Politics ==
Frieda Wunderlich was a member of the German Democratic Party which became the DStP in 1930. From 1925 until 1933, she served on the city council in Berlin and from 1930 until 1932 was politically active as a representative of the German Democratic Party in the Prussian parliament, where she stressed social issues and the politics of the labour market.

She was also active in the women's movement. For example, she published a paper in 1924 about the problems of maternity leave and women's employment protection in general ("Frauen als Subjekte und Objekte der Sozialpolitik" in Kölner Sozialpolitische Vierteljahresschrift). She was convinced that with the expansion of public social welfare policies, women would gain additional employment opportunities. Her emigration to the U.S. made it possible for Wunderlich to enjoy a degree of gender equality not possible elsewhere at the time. She said:

It still holds true that in Germany the fundamental principle is that woman is meant for marriage, while in the United States woman's life is regarded as an end in itself which may find completion without marriage.

— Frieda Wunderlich, Wobbe, Frieda Wunderlich, p. 221.

== Publications ==
- Handbuch der Kriegsfürsorge (Hrsg. Nationaler Frauendienst), 1916
- Hugo Münsterbergs Bedeutung für die Nationalökonomie, 1920
- Die Bekämpfung der Arbeitslosigkeit in Deutschland, 1925
- Produktivität, Jena 1926
- Kampf um die Sozialversicherung, 1930
- Versicherung und Fürsorge, 1930
- Labor under German Democracy, 1940
- British Labor and the War, 1941
- German Labor Courts, 1947
- Farm Labor in Germany, 1960

== Literature ==
- Theresa Wobbe: Wahlverwandtschaften. Die Soziologie und die Frauen auf dem Weg zur Wissenschaft, Berlin 1995, bes. 170–186
  - with Claudia Honegger eds.: Frauen in der Soziologie. Neun Portraits.(sic) Beck, München 1998 ISBN 3406392989 (außer F. W.: Dorothy Swaine Thomas, Marie Jahoda, Jenny P. d'Héricourt (Jenny d'Héricourt), Mathilde Vaerting, Béatrice Webb, Jane Addams, Harriet Martineau und Marianne Weber
- Klemens Wittebur: Die Deutsche Soziologie im Exil 1933–1945, Lit, Münster 1991 (Dissertation von 1989), S. 73 f.
- Christine von Oertzen, Strategie Verständigung – Zur transnationalen Vernetzung von Akademikerinnen 1917–1955, Göttingen 2012.
