= Bernhard Bauer =

Bernhard Bauer may refer to:

- Bernhard Bauer (gynaecologist) (1882–1942), Austrian gynaecologist and writer on women
- Bernhard Bauer (skier) (born 1967), German former alpine skier
