= Fritz Wittels =

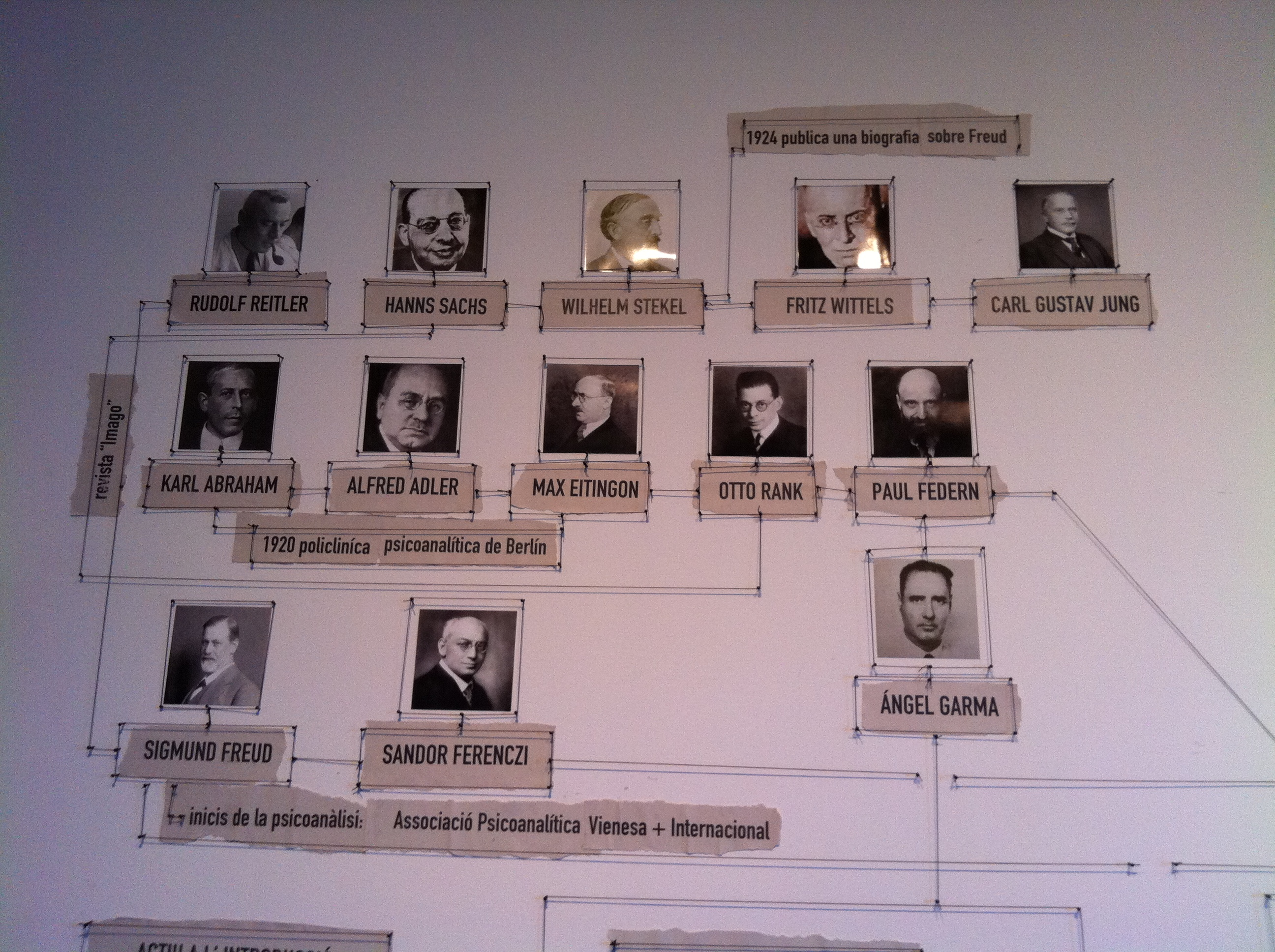
Photograph of Fritz Wittels between Wilhelm Stekel and Carl Gustav Jung

Fritz Wittels, born Siegfried Wittels (November 14, 1880, in Vienna – October 16, 1950, in New York City), was an Austrian-born American psychoanalyst.

Wittels was the biographer of Sigmund Freud and the first psychoanalyst of E. E. Cummings.

== Works ==
- Sigmund Freud; der Mann, die Lehre, die Schule. Leipzig: Tal, 1924. Translated by Eden and Cedar Paul as Sigmund Freud, His Personality, His Teaching, & His School, London: G. Allen & Unwin, 1924
- Die Vernichtung der Not. Translated by Cedar and Eden Paul as An end to poverty, London: G. Allen & Unwin, 1925
- The Jeweller of Bagdad. Doran, illustrated by Violet Brunton, 1927
- Critique of love. New York: The Macaulay Company, 1929
- Die Befreiung des Kindes, 1927. Translated by Cedar and Eden Paul as Set the Children Free!, London: G. Allen & Unwin, Ltd., 1932
- Translated by Louise Brink as Freud and his time: the influence of the master psychologist on the emotional problems in our lives, New York: Liveright, 1931
- (ed. by Edward Timms) Freud and the child woman: the memoirs of Fritz Wittels, New Haven: Yale University Press, 1995
