= John Howes Gleason =

American historian (1908–2001)

- Born: August 6, 1908; Newton, Massachusetts, United States
- Died: June 29, 2001 (aged 92); Claremont, California, United States
- Education: Harvard University
- Occupation: Historian
- Employer: Pomona College

John Howes Gleason (August 6, 1908 – June 29, 2001) was an American historian specializing in British foreign policy and Anglo-Russian relations in the 19th century. He served as a professor of history at Pomona College in Claremont, California, from 1939 until his retirement in 1973.

== Biography ==
Gleason was born in Newton, Massachusetts, to Charles Bemis Gleason and Helen Zabriskie Howes. He earned his degrees from Harvard University and began teaching at Pomona College in 1939. He resided in Claremont, California, until his death in 2001.

== Work ==
One of Gleason's publications is The Genesis of Russophobia in Great Britain: A Study of the Interaction of Policy and Opinion (Harvard University Press, 1950). This work examines the development of anti-Russian sentiment in British political and public spheres during the 19th century, focusing on figures such as David Urquhart and Lord Palmerston.

Frieda Wunderlich wrote

The importance of the book lies not only in the interesting complete account of Anglo-Russian relations but also in the background of the general development of international politics in the 26-year period covered.. In showing the interaction of public opinion and of policy, the author provides a valuable contribution to the psychology and technique of public opinion.

== Legacy ==
Gleason's papers are archived at the Online Archive of California.
