= Rudolf Brunngraber =

Austrian writer, journalist and painter

Rudolf Brunngraber (1901, Vienna – 1960) was an Austrian writer, journalist and painter who worked with Otto Neurath. His novels were translated into eighteen languages, with more than a million books sold.

Brunngraber's novel Radium was adapted for radio by Günter Eich in 1937.

== Works ==
- Karl und das 20. Jahrhundert. Roman, Frankfurt am Main: Societäts-Verlag, 1933. Translated by Eden and Cedar Paul as Karl and the twentieth century, 1933
- Radium; Roman eines Elements, Rowohlt, 1936. Translated by Eden and Cedar Paul as Radium; a novel, 1936.
- Die Engel in Atlantis, 1938.
- Opiumkrieg, roman, 1939.
- Zucker aus Cuba, roman eines goldrausches, 1941.
- Prozess auf Tod und Leben, 1948
- Heroin, 1951
