= Gustav Heyer =

Gustav Richard Heyer (29 April 1890 – 19 November 1967) was a Jungian psychologist, "the first significant person in Germany to be attracted to Jung's psychology".

== Life ==
Heyer was a Munich medical doctor. In 1918 he married Lucie Grote, a masseuse, dancer and student of Elsa Gindler. Heyer and his wife pioneered together a combined physical and psychological therapy. They both underwent training with Carl Jung in the mid-1920s, and Heyer became a close friend of Jung. He was Jung's deputy for a year when Jung controversially assumed the presidency of the General Medical Society for Psychotherapy, and Jung wrote an introduction for Heyer's The Organism of the Mind. In 1936, however, he and Jung argued at the annual meeting of the society.

Lucie Grote divorced Heyer in the mid-1930s, partly because he loved another woman. Later, he joined the Nazi party in 1937, and in 1939 went to Berlin to teach and see patients at the Goering Institute. Like many Nazis, his anti-Semitism was not without complication. In September 1938, for example, he wrote a warm letter of recommendation for the Jewish Max Zeller, who had been in analysis with him that year before being interned in a camp. Heyer remained a member of the Nazi Party until 1944. That year, reviewing the German edition of Jung's writings, Heyer criticised Jung 's "western-democratic audience" and his attack upon totalitarianism. After the war Jung denounced Heyer for his Nazi past, and refused ever to meet with him again. Heyer moved to practice and write in rural Bavaria until his death. Heyer's daughter burned all of her father's papers.

== Works ==
- Seelenführung: Möglichkeiten, Wege, Grenzen, Potsdam: Müller & Kiepenheuer, 1929.
- Der Organismus der Seele : Eine Einführung in die analytische Seelenheilkunde, München: J. F. Lehmann, 1932. Translated by Eden and Cedar Paul as The organism of the mind; an introduction to analytical psychotherapy, London: K. Paul, Trench, Trubner & Co., 1933.
- Praktische Seelenheilkunde; eine Einführung in die Psychotherapie für Ärzte und Studierende, München: J.F. Lehmann, 1935.
