= Curt Thesing =

Curt Egon Thesing (21 April 1879, Danzig, West Prussia, today's Gdańsk, Poland – 25 May 1956, Bad Tölz, West Germany) was a German zoologist, publisher, populariser of science and translator.

== Life ==
In 1913 Thesing joined Otto val Halem as partner and managing director of Veit and Comp. Following wartime propaganda collaboration with a German-Austrian publishers' association, Veit & Comp. was incorporated into Walter de Gruyter on 1 January 1919 – despite some political reservations from Thesing, who was on the political left. In May 1920 he withdrew as a partner from the firm for health reasons.

== Works ==
Authored works

- Lectures on Biology. London: John Bale, Sons & Danielsson, 1910. Translated from the 2nd ed. by W. R. Boelter.
- Stammesgeschichte der Liebe, Berlin: Brehm, [1932]. Translated by Eden and Cedar Paul as Genealogy of love, London : Routledge, 1933. American edition Genealogy of sex: sex in its myriad forms, from the one-celled animal to the human being. New York: Emerson Books, 1934.
- Schule der Biologie , 1934. Translated by Eden and Cedar Paul as School of Biology, London: G. Routledge and sons, Ltd., 1935.

Translations

- (tr. with Marguerite Thesing) Mein Leben und Work by Henry Ford. Leipzig: Paul List (publisher), 1923. Translated from My Life and Work, New York: Doubleday, Page & Co., 1923
- (tr.) Hauptmann Sorrell und sein Sohn: roman by Warwick Deeping. Bremen: Schünemann, 1927. Translated from Sorrell and Son, London: Cassell & Co.
- (tr. with Wa. Ostwald) Und Trotzdem Vorwärts! by Henry Ford. Leipzig: Paul List (publisher) 1930. Translated from Moving Forwards
- (tr.) Der rote Handel droht! : Der Fortschritt des Fünfjahresplans der Sowjets by H. R. Knickerbocker. 1931. Translated from Fighting the Red trade menace
- (tr.) Bezwinger des Hungers by Paul Henry de Kruif. Berlin: Holle & Co. Verlag, [1934] . Translated from Hunger fighters.
- (tr.) Frau Buck and ihre Töchter. Roman by Warwick Deeping. Bremen: Carl Schünemann, Verlag, [1937]. Translated from The Road.
