= Tietjens =

Tietjens is a surname. Notable people with the surname include:

- Carl Tietjens (born 1986), Australian cricketer
- Doug Tietjens (born 1984), New Zealand rugby player
- Edwin Tietjens (1894–1944), German psychiatrist
- Eunice Tietjens (1884–1944), American writer
- Gordon Tietjens (born 1955), New Zealand rugby coach
- Jim Tietjens (born 1960), American soccer player
- Norman O. Tietjens (1903–1983), American judge
- Paul Tietjens (1877–1943), American composer
- Thérèse Tietjens (1831–1877), German soprano

== See also ==
- Tietjen
