= Arno Schirokauer =

Arno Fritz Kurt Schirokauer (20 July 1899 – 24 May 1954) was a German-Jewish literary scholar, best known for his biography of Ferdinand Lassalle.

In 1939, Schirokauer managed to travel to Havana, Cuba and on to Memphis. There he taught at Southwestern College as a Visiting Lecturer in Medieval Studies - his salary provided by other Jews in Memphis, since college rules prohibited non-Christian faculty - until he moved on to the Carl Schurz Foundation of Philadelphia. He taught at Yale University from 1941 to 1943, at Kenyon College from 1943 to 1944, at Yale again 1944 to 1945, and at Johns Hopkins University from 1946 until his death in 1954.

== Works ==
- Lassalle, die Macht der Illusion, die Illusion der Macht. Translated into English by Eden and Cedar Paul as Lassalle; the power of illusion and the illusion of power. London: G. Allen & Unwin Ltd., [1931].
- (ed. with Wolfgang Paulsen) Corona: studies in celebration of the eightieth birthday of Samuel Singer, professor emeritus, University of Berne, Switzerland. Durham, NC, 1941.
- Germanistische Studien. Hamburg: E. Hauswedell, 1957.
