= Yuri Steklov =

Soviet politician and historian (1870-1941)

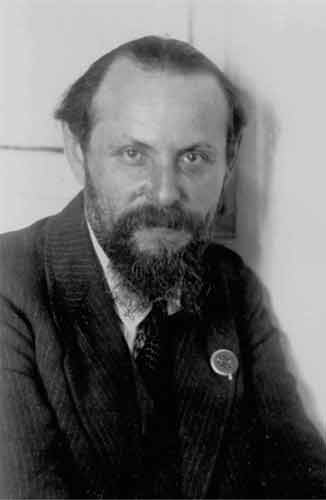
Yuri Steklov c. 1930s

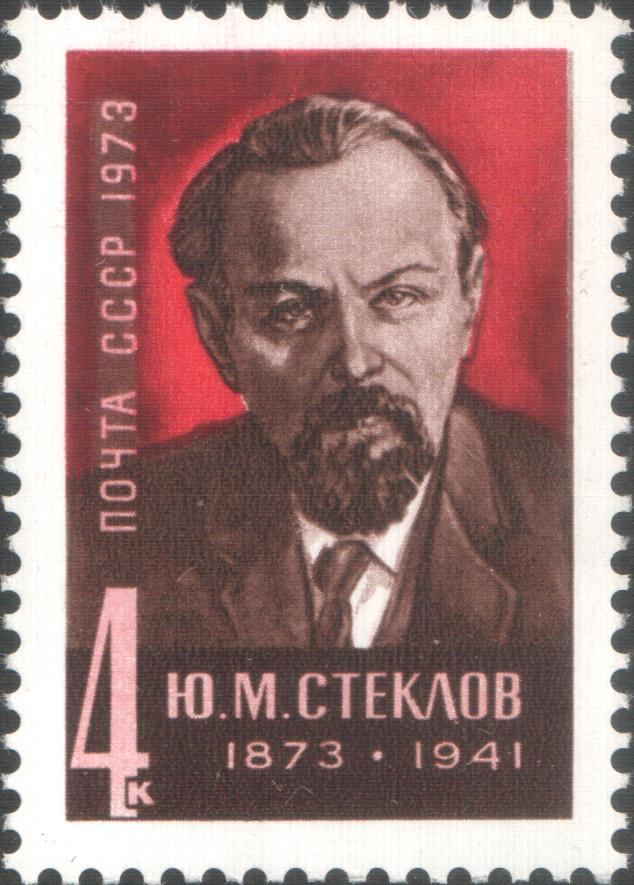
Yury Steklov on a 1973 Soviet postal stamp.

Yuri Mikhailovich Steklov (Russian: Юрий Михайлович Стеклов; born Ovshey Moiseyevich Nakhamkis; Russian: Овший Моисе́евич Наха́мкис; 27 August [O.S. 15 August] 1873, Odessa – 15 September 1941, Saratov) was a Russian revolutionary, Soviet politician, journalist, editor and historian.

Steklov joined the Bolshevik faction of the Russian Social Democratic Labour Party in 1903 and became editor of Izvestia of the Petrograd Soviet after the Russian Revolution. He wrote biographies of Mikhail Bakunin and Alexander Herzen, as well as commentary on Karl Marx and Vladimir Lenin.

Steklov was arrested in February 1938 amid the Great Purge. After the outbreak of World War II on the Eastern Front, he was transferred to the Saratov prison, where he died on September 15, 1941, from dysentery and extreme exhaustion at the age of 68. He was posthumously rehabilitated in 1956.

== Works ==
- Michael Bakunin: ein Lebensbild, Stuttgart: J.H.W. Dietz, 1913
- A. J. Herzen: eine Biographie, Berlin: A. Seehof, 1920.
- History of the first International, London: M. Lawrence, [1928]. Translated by Cedar and Eden Paul from the 3rd Russian ed., with notes from the 4th ed.
