= Friedrich Jacobsohn =

Friedrich Jacobsohn (born 1894) was a German urologist and writer on sex.

Jacobsohn's book Geschlechtsleben und sexuelle Hygiene (1932) was written with Abraham Buschke, a dermatologist and expert on venereal disease. Illustrated with some colour plates, it was translated into English, where it went through several editions. Given the different sexual needs of men and women, men were not encouraged to over-extend intercourse after orgasm: they should "enjoy sexual intercourse in normal fashion, without extensive preliminaries, without any attempt at artificial prolongation, but proceeding as quickly as may be to orgasm and ejaculation."

== Works ==
- (with Abraham Buschke) Geschlechtsleben und sexuelle Hygiene, Berlin und Leipzig: W. de Gruyter & Co., 1932. Translated by Eden and Cedar Paul as Introduction to Sexual Hygiene, London: G. Routledge & Sons, 1932. American edition Sex Habits: A vital factor in well-being, New York: Emerson Books, 1936.
