= Michael Prawdin =

Russian-German historical writer

Michael Prawdin was the pseudonym of Michael Charol (20 January 1894 – 23 December 1970), a Russian-German historical writer.

Born in present-day Ukraine, Charol came to Germany after the Russian Revolution. He studied in Germany, and wrote in German. In 1934, he made a plea for the 'factual novel'.

Prawdin made himself an international reputation with two books on Genghis Khan. The Nazi bureaucrat Heinrich Himmler sufficiently admired the books that he ordered the publication of a one-volume edition in 1938, a copy of which was given to every SS leader; the book appears to have encouraged Adolf Hitler to claim inspiration from Genghis Khan.

== Reception ==
Reception seems to have varied with time.

- In 1942, L. Carrington Goodrich reviewed the 1940 translation of The Mongol Empire. He started: "This is a readable book. Between its covers is the whole story of the Mongols from Yesugai, father fo Temuchin, to the incident at Marco Polo Bridge.", continued with "The comment on the dust cover states: It is a standard work, written equally for the serious student of history and for the reader who likes an exciting story", and disagrees about standard work for serious student: "With the first part of that sentence this reviewer takes sharp issue. The author has made numerous errors, skims lightly over certain important developments, gives only fragments of quotations without credit to translator..., fails to utilize fully his own sources which are far from complete, and makes assumptions which hard indeed to follow. This is slick writing, not sober history" that . He continued that "part of Prawdin’s trouble is carelessness", and that "some of his suppressions or condensations of material seem surprising because the facts are well known and of general interest".
- In his Introduction to a 2006 reprint of The Mongol Empire Gérard Chaliand said Michael Prawdin tells us a story "with great literary talent.".
- To 2017 edition of The Mongol Empire : its rise and legacy, Maurice Collis said "It has the rare merit of being both scholarly and exciting".

== Works ==
- Eine Welt zerbricht: Ein Tatsachenroman, 1933. Translated by Kenneth Kirkness as Double Eagle, London: Selwyn & Blount, 1934.
- Tschingis-Chan, der Sturm aus Asien, 1934, Stuttgart, Deutsche Verlags-Anstalt.
- Tschingis-Chan und sein Erbe, 1935. Translated by Eden and Cedar Paul as The Mongol Empire: Its Rise and Legacy, 1937.
- Johanna die Wahnsinnige, Habsburgs Weg zum Weltreich, 1937. Translated by Eden and Cedar Paul as The Mad Queen of Spain, London: G. Allen and Unwin Ltd, 1938.
- Russland, Stuttgart: Deutsche Verlags-Anstalt, 1951.
- Netschajew--von Moskau verschwiegen, 1961. Translated as The Unmentionable Nechaev: A Key to Bolshevism. London: Allen and Unwin, 1961.
- Marie de Rohan, duchesse de Chevreuse, London: Allen & Unwin, 1971.
