= Apostel =

Apostel may refer to:

== People ==
- Hans Erich Apostel (1901–1972), German-born Austrian composer
- Henryk Apostel (1941– ), Polish footballer
- Leo Apostel (1925–1995), Belgian philosopher

== Other ==
- 6710 Apostel, asteroid
- Apostel, play by Andreas Latzko
