= Valeriu Marcu =

Valeriu Marcu (Romanian pronunciation: [vaˈlerju ˈmarku]; 8 March 1899 in Bucharest, Romania – 4 July 1942 in New York City, United States) was a Romanian poet, writer and historian. He wrote the first biography of Vladimir Lenin.

In his younger years, Marcu was acquainted with both Lenin and Leon Trotsky. During his years in Berlin, Marcu became acquainted with (among other avant-garde literary figures at the time) the Austrian playwright Arnolt Bronnen and the German author Ernst Jünger, who would remain a lifelong correspondent. He also gave the eulogy at fellow communist Paul Levi's funeral in 1930. Marcu, who was Jewish, migrated from Germany to Austria, and then to France, where he and his wife Eva settled in Nice in 1933. In 1940 Varian Fry helped the family get papers to leave France.

== Works ==
- Lenin: 30 Jahre Russland, 1927. Translated by E. W. Dickes as Lenin. New York: Macmillan Co., 1928.
- Männer und Mächte der Gegenwart, 1930. Translated by Eden and Cedar Paul as Men and Forces of Our Time, 1931
- The Birth of the Nations, From the Unity of Faith to the Democracy of Money, 1932.
