= Grete Meisel-Hess =

Austrian Jewish feminist and writer

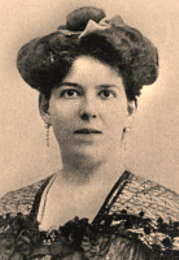
Meisel-Hess, c. 1920

Grete Meisel-Hess (18 April 1879, Prague – 18 April 1922, Berlin) was an Austrian Jewish feminist who wrote novels, short stories and essays about women's need for sexual liberation.

Meisel-Hess lived in Vienna from 1893 to 1908. She viewed both anti-Semitism and anti-feminism as signs of degeneration which needed to be overcome by progressive politics.

She wrote for Franz Pfemfert's journal Die Aktion.

== Works ==
- Die sexuelle Krise. Eine sozialpsychologische Untersuchung, 1909. Translated by Eden and Cedar Paul as The sexual crisis: a critique of our sex life, 1917.
- Die Intellektuellen [The Intellectuals], 1911
- Sexuelle Rechte, 1914
- Betrachtungen zur Frauenfrage, 1914
- Die Bedeutung der Monogamie, 1916

== Secondary Literature ==
- Helga Thorson, Grete Meisel-Hess: The New Woman and the Sexual Crisis. Rochester, New York: Camden House, 2022.
