= Lucien Deslinières =

Lucien Deslinières (1857 in Vierzon – 1937 in Vernouillet) was a French journalist, writer and socialist.

Deslinières joined the Parti Ouvrier Français (POF) in 1891. He later tried unsuccessfully to establish a collectivist settlement in Mexico. After the Russian Revolution, he travelled to the USSR, becoming an agricultural commissar in Ukraine in 1920. Civil war and shortage of money blocking his schemes of agrarian reform, he returned to France.

== Works ==
- L'application du système collectiviste, 1899
- Projet de code socialiste, 1908
- Le Maroc socialiste, 1912
- Comment se réalisera le socialisme, 1919. Translated by Eden and Cedar Paul as The coming of socialism
- La France nord-africaine; étude critique de la colonisation anarchique pratiquée jusqu'à ce jour. Projet de colonisation organisée, 1920
- Délivrons-nous du Marxisme, 1923
- La production intensive, 1923
- Principes d'économie socialiste, 1924
- Dans l'ornière marxiste, en France, en Russie : pour en sortir, 1927
