= Alfred Berthoud =

Swiss chemist (1874–1939)

Alfred Berthoud (1874–1939) was a Swiss chemist, professor of chemistry at the University of Neuchâtel.

In 1908 Berthoud became professor of physical chemistry at the University of Neuchâtel, though he continued teaching in secondary schools until he was appointed Professor of Inorganic Chemistry and Analytical Chemistry at the University in 1925. In 1938 he was made President of the Swiss Chemical Society.

== Works ==
- Les Nouvelles conceptions de la matière et de l'atome, 1923. Translated by Eden and Cedar Paul as The new theories of matter and the atom, 1924.
- Photochimie, 1928
- Précis de chimie physique, 1939
