= Communist Russia =

Communist Russia may refer to:

- Russian Soviet Federative Socialist Republic, the biggest republic of the Soviet Union, 1918–1991
- Union of Soviet Socialist Republics, commonly known as the Soviet Union, 1922–1991

== See also ==
- All-Russian Communist Party (Bolsheviks)
- Soviet Russia (disambiguation)
