= Tietjen =

Tietjen is a German surname. Notable people with the surname include:

- Bettina Tietjen (born 1960), German television presenter
- Friedrich Tietjen (1834–1895), German astronomer
- Heinz Tietjen (1881–1967), German conductor
- Henry Roland Tietjen (1891-1976), American Legislator (Utah)
- James J. Tietjen (1933–2016), American researcher and executive
- John Tietjen (1928–2004), American Lutheran clergyman, theologian

== Other uses ==
- 2158 Tietjen, main-belt asteroid
- Wilhelm-Tietjen-Stiftung für Fertilisation, fertility research group

== See also ==
- Tietjens
