= William J. Robinson =

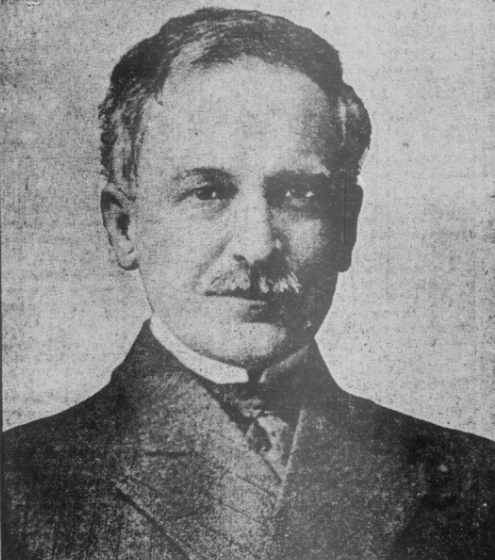
William J. Robinson

William Josephus Robinson (December 8, 1867 – January 6, 1936) was an American physician, sexologist and birth control advocate. He was Chief of the department of Genito-Urinary Diseases at Bronx Hospital Dispensary, and editor of the American Journal of Urology and Sexology. Robinson was active in the birth control movement in the United States. He was "the first American physician to demand that contraceptive knowledge be taught to medical students and [...] probably the most influential and popular of the American physicians writing on birth control in the first three decades of the twentieth century".

As well as his own medical writings, Robinson edited the works of the pioneering pediatrician Abraham Jacobi. He was also a freethinking critic of Christianity.

He was a proponent of eugenics, which is a form of scientific racism, and published the following works advocating forced sterilization: Fewer and better babies, birth control; or, The limitation of offspring by prevenception, 1916 and Eugenics, Marriage and Birth Control: (Practical Eugenics), 1917. He stated that people of an inferior nature “have no rights. They have no right in the first instance to be born, but, having been born, they have no right to propagate their kind."

== Works ==
- (ed.) Dr. Jacobi's works. Collected essays, addresses, scientific papers and miscellaneous writings of A. Jacobi, 1909
- Never-told tales, 1909
- (with Leo Jacobi and others) Sex morality: past present and future, 1912. Online here. Reviewed by Horace Traubel, The Conservator 23:73 (July 1912).
- Sexual problems of today, 1912. Reviewed by Horace Traubel, The Conservator 23:139 (November 1912).
- 'Walt Whitman and sex', The Conservator 24:53 (June 1913).
- A practical treatise on the causes, symptoms, and treatment of sexual impotence and other sexual disorders in men and women, 1913
- The treatment of gonorrhea and its complications in men and women, for the general practitioner, 1915
- Fewer and better babies, birth control; or, The limitation of offspring by prevenception, 1916
  - Birth Control, or, The Limitation of Offspring, 1916, The Critic and Guide Co.
- Woman: her sex and love life, 1917
- Eugenics, Marriage and Birth Control: (Practical Eugenics), 1917
  - Woman: Her sex and love life, 1929, Eugenics publishing.
- Sexual Truths versus Sexual Lies, Misconceptions, and Exaggerations, 1919, The American Biological Society.
- Married Life and Happiness, or, Love and Comfort in Marriage, 1922, Eugenics Publishing Co.
- A doctor's view on life, 1927. Edited by Eden and Cedar Paul.
- Sex, love and morality : a rational code of sexual ethics based upon the highest principle of morality--the principle of human happiness; the last word on the subject, 1928
- Practical prevenception; or, The technique of birth control; giving the latest methods of prevention of conception, discussing their effect, favorable or unfavorable, on the sex act; their indications and contra-indications, pointing out the reasons for failures and how to avoid them. For the medical profession only, 1929
- The oldest profession in the world; prostitution, its underlying causes, its treatment and its future, 1929
- If I were God: a freethinker's faith, incorporating a discussion between the author and a Catholic priest, New York: The Freethought Press Association, 1930. With an introduction by Harry Elmer Barnes. Online at the Internet Archive.
- Rosary of Lay Saints, New York: The Freethough Press Association, 1932
- Soviet Russia as I saw it; its crimes and stupidities, 1932
- Happiness and how to attain it, 1933
- Medical and sex dictionary, 1933
- The law against abortion; its perniciousness demonstrated and its repeal demanded, 1933
- Our mysterious life glands and how they affect us. A popular treatise on our glands and their secretions - what they do to us, how they affect our health, growth, appearance, temper, mentality, and character; including the vitamins, 1934
