= E. W. Dickes =

English journalist and translator

Ernest Walter Dickes (19 March 1876 – 26 July 1957), most commonly known as E. W. Dickes, was an English journalist for the Manchester Guardian, and translator of more than 70 books.

== Biography ==
Dickes was the eldest son of Walter James Dickes and Sarah Anne Dickes. Born in Camberwell, London, he was educated at the City of London School. He became a civil servant in the Admiralty for 20 years, and spent five years as a dockyard secretary in Malta. In 1915, as deputy cashier at Portsmouth Dockyard, he was charged with being in possession of false documents. The following year, as a conscientious objector, he came to the attention of the House of Commons. He spent two years in prison, during which time he learnt Esperanto.

After the war he joined the Manchester Guardian as a journalist, amongst other things serving as an in-house translator from French, German, Italian, Spanish, Dutch, Portuguese, Polish, Latin, Greek, Danish, and Russian.

Dickes married twice: his first wife divorced him in 1936, and he married Doris Whittle shortly after. He died in Stockport, Cheshire, aged 81.

== Translations ==
- Hermann Lutz, Lord Grey and the Great War, New York: A.A. Knopf, 1928.
- Valeriu Marcu, Lenin. New York: Macmillan Co., 1928. Translated from the German Lenin: 30 Jahre Russland.
- Karl Friedrich Nowak, Kaiser and Chancellor; the opening years of the reign of Kaiser Wilhelm II, 1930
- Karl Friedrich Nowak, Germany's road to ruin; the middle of the reign of Emperor William II, 1932
- Hans Kohn, Western civilization in the Near East, 1935
- Alexander Mosolov, At the court of the last tsar, London, 1935.
- Andreas Latzko, Lafayette, a life, New York: Literary guild, 1936. Translated from the German.
- Theodor Wolff, The Eve of 1914, New York: A.A. Knopf, 1936. Translated from the German Der krieg des Pontius Pilatus.
- Antonina Vallentin, Leonardo da Vinci: the tragic pursuit of perfection. New York: Viking, 1938. Translated from the German manuscript.
- Hermann Rauschning, The revolution of nihilism: warning to the West. New York: Alliance Book Corp., Longmans, Green & Co, 1939. Translated from the German.
- Sergeĭ Chakhotin, The rape of the masses; the psychology of totalitarian political propaganda, New York, Alliance Book Corp., [1940].
- Moritz Goldstein: Führers must fall. A study of the phenomenon of power from Caesar to Hitler. Übersetzung ins Englische E. W. Dickes, W. H.Allan & Co, London 1942.
- Levin Ludwig Schücking, The sociology of literary taste, 1944
- Wilhelm Röpke, The solution of the German problem, New York: G.P. Putnam's Sons, [1947]. Revised and enlarged ed. of The German question (published London, 1946). Published in Switzerland in 1945 as Die deutsche Frage.
- Antonina Vallentin, Mirabeau, New York Viking Press, 1948. Translated from the French works Mirabeau avant la Révolution and Mirabeau dans la Révolution
- Maxime Weygand, Recalled to Service. Heinemann, London, 1952.
- Klaus Günther, Creatures of the deep sea, 1956
- Georg Misch, The History of Autobiography in Antiquity
- Gaetano Salvemini, The Fascist Dictatorship
- Grigory Semyonov, Conquest of Siberia
