= Mathilde Vaerting =

Mathilde Vaerting (10 January 1884, Messingen – 6 May 1977, Schönau im Schwarzwald) was a German feminist and writer on matriarchy.

Vaerting's A New Basis for the Psychology of Man and Woman (1921) explained gender role differences functionally rather than biologically, criticising most previous studies of gender as based on "a kind of unquestioned association of men with dominance and women with subordination". In 1923 the Social Democratic government of Thuringia appointed her to a chair of education at the University of Jena.

== Works ==
- Neubegründung der Psychologie von Mann und Weib: Die weibliche Eigenart im Männerstaat und die männliche Eigenart im Frauenstaat, 1921. Translated by Cedar and Eden Paul as The dominant sex; a study in the sociology of sex differentiation, New York, George H. Doran Co., [1923]. Etext online at the University of Virginia Library
