= Bertha Eckstein-Diener =

Austrian writer, travel journalist and feminist historian

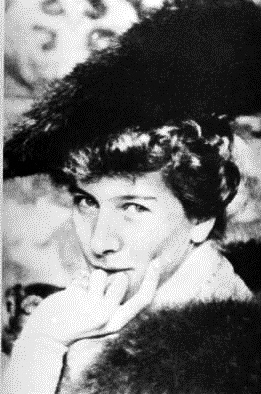
Bertha Eckstein in 1902

Bertha Eckstein-Diener (18 March 1874, Vienna – 20 February 1948, Geneva), also known by her American pseudonym as Helen Diner, was an Austrian writer, travel journalist, feminist historian and intellectual. Her book Mothers and Amazons (1930), was the first to focus on women's cultural history. It is regarded as a classic study of matriarchy.

She was a member of the "Arthurians," a group of European intellectuals active in the 1930s, each of whom adopted a name from King Arthur's Round Table (Diner was Sir Galahad). Each member undertook to research an area of knowledge hitherto little known to Western culture. Diner set out to document a feminist history of women, and infused her book Mothers and Amazons (Mütter und Amazonen) with lyrical and poetic language.

== Life ==
Bertha Diener came from a middle-class family and received a higher education. Against the will of her parents, she married the polymath Friedrich Eckstein, a Viennese scholar and industrialist, in 1898. Like her husband, she was a member of the Vienna Lodge of the Theosophical Society Adyar (Adyar-TG). The couple received in their home at this time such notables as Karl Kraus, Adolf Loos, and Peter Altenberg. In 1904, Bertha left her husband and her son Percy (born 1899) and began her travels, which took her to Egypt, Greece, and England. The couple finally divorced in 1909, and Frederick Eckstein died in 1939 at the age of 78.

Her 2nd son, Roger (born 1910), was fathered by Theodore Beer, but was placed with a foster family and did not make contact again with his mother until 1936 by letter and in person only in 1938 in Berlin. From 1919, Diener lived in Lucerne, Switzerland. Diener initially wrote under the pseudonym Ahasvera (roughly translated as "Perpetual traveler"). Her best-known works were published under the name Sir Galahad, from the knights of King Arthur. Besides her books, she wrote a series of articles for newspapers and magazines and translated three works of American journalists and the esoteric writer Prentice Mulford.

Between 1914 and 1919, she wrote Kegelschnitte Gottes, about the situation of women during that period. From 1925 to 1931, she worked on Mütter und Amazonen, a women-focused cultural history, based on the work of Johann Jakob Bachofen.

She died aged 73 on 20 February 1948 in Geneva, five weeks after an operation. Her last work, a cultural history of England, remained unfinished.

== Works ==
Unless otherwise indicated, the works first appeared under the pseudonym Sir Galahad.

- Im palast des Minos (In the Palace of Minos), Munich: Albert Langen, 1913. 118 pp., 2nd ed., 1924.
- (tr.) Der Unfug des Sterbens: ausgewählte Essays by Prentice Mulford. Munich: Langen, [1920].
- Die Kegelschnitte Gottes; Roman (The Conic Sections of God: Novel), Munich: Albert Langen, 1921. 546 pp. 2nd ed., 1926; 3rd ed., 1932.
- (tr.) Das Ende des Unfugs: ausgewählte Essays by Prentice Mulford. Munich: Albert Langen, 1922.
- Idiotenführer durch die russische Literatur (Idiot's Guide to Russian literature). Munich: Albert Langen, 1925. 163 pp.
- Mütter und Amazone: ein Umriss weiblicher Reiche (Mothers and Amazons: an outline of female empires), Munich: Albert Langen, 1932. 305 pp. Various later eds., from 1981 by Ullstein in paperback, with the subtitle Liebe und Macht im Frauenreich (love and power in the rule of women). ISBN 3-548-35594-3. Translated into English by John Philip Lundin as Mothers and Amazons: the first feminine history of culture, New York: Julian Press, 1965. Introduction by Joseph Campbell.
- Byzanz; von kaisern, engeln und eunuchen (Byzantium. Of emperors, angels and eunuchs), Leipzig and Vienna: Tal, 1936. 318 pp. Translated into English by Eden and Cedar Paul as Emperors, angels, and eunuchs: the thousand years of the Byzantine Empire, London: Chatto & Windus, 1938. US edition published as Imperial Byzantium, 1938.
- Bohemund: ein Kreuzfahrer-Roman (Bohemond: a Crusader novel), Leipzig: Goten-Verlag Herbert Eisentraut, 1938. 291 pp.
- (as Helen Diner) Seide: Eine kleine Kulturgeschichte (Silk: a small cultural history), Leipzig: Goten-Verlag H. Eisentraut, 1940. 259 pp., 2nd ed., 1944; 3rd ed., 1949.
- Der glückliche Hügel; ein Richard-Wagner-Roman (The lucky hill: a Richard Wagner novel), Zürich: Atlantis, 1943. 366 pp.
