= International General Medical Society for Psychotherapy =

Organisation founded in 1926

International General Medical Society for Psychotherapy was a society founded in 1926. The German physicians Gustav Richard Heyer and Carl Haberlin were among the organization's founders. The prefix international was added in 1934, after Carl Gustav Jung became president in 1933 and issued a series of statute ratifications for making the organization international and not discriminating members based on race, religion, or nationality.
