= Ludwig Bauer (journalist) =

Austro-Swiss journalist, pacifist and writer

Ludwig Bauer (born 1876, Vienna) was an Austro-Swiss journalist, pacifist and writer.

== Life ==
Bauer became a journalist in Vienna, writing theater criticism, travel writing and miscellaneous journalism. In 1915, hating the First World War, he moved to Switzerland. From the Wiener Cafe in Bern, an "amiable giant who eats at a sitting enough for four ordinary men and washes it down with incredible quantities of beer", he wrote leaders for the Basle National Zeitung, gaining a reputation - and criticism from partisans on each side - as "the only neutral in Switzerland".

Morgen Wieder Krieg (1931), translated into English as War Again Tomorrow, warned of the dangers of another world war. The book, described by one reviewed as "a pacifist's lugubrious view of the League, the Versailles settlement, Sovietism, Fascism, Americanism and other matters", was recommended by Albert Einstein in The World As I See It.

== Works ==
- Von den Schlachtfeldern in Galizien. Kleine Bilder aus dem grossen Kriege, Leipzig, 1914
- Der Kampf um den Frieden, Bern, 1918
- Morgen wieder Krieg : Untersuchung der Gegenwart, Blick in die Zukunft, Berlin: Ernest Rowohlt Verlag, 1931. Translated into English by W. Horsfall Carter as War Again Tomorrow, 1932.
- Welt im Sturz, Leipzig: Tal, 1933
- Und Österreich?. Ein Staat sucht ein Volk, Paris: Éditions du Mercure de l'Europe, 1933
- Leopold der Ungeliebte : König der Belgier und des Geldes, 1934. Translated vy Eden and Cedar Paul as Leopold the Unloved. King of the Belgians and of money, 1934.

== See also ==
- List of peace activists
