= Edwin Tietjens =

German psychiatrist (1894-1944)

Edwin Tietjens (20 March 1894, Saint Petersburg - 22 May 1944) was a psychiatrist in Berlin in the 1920s and 1930s and resistance fighter against the Nazis.

== Life ==
Tietjens had a doctorate in philosophy. In 1926 he became the fourth husband of Luigina von Fabrice. His 1929 book Desuggestion, translated into English, was widely reviewed. In 1943 Tietjens and his wife Gina hid a Jewish shoe worker, Ruth Heynemann, and her mother, finding them false papers and taking care of them in their Berlin house. After Tietjens died of a heart attack, his wife continued to look after the women until the Russian army arrived. For this they have been recognized as among the Righteous Among the Nations.

== Works ==
- Desuggestion; ihre Bedeutung und Auswertung: Gesundheit, Erfolg, Glück, Berlin: O. Elsner, 1929.
  - Translated by Eden and Cedar Paul as Desuggestion for the attainment of health, happiness, and success, London: Allen & Unwin, [1931].
