= Bernhard Bauer (gynaecologist) =

Bernhard Adam Bauer (5 June 1882 – 29 April 1942) was an Austrian gynecologist and writer on women.

Woman (1927), dealing with "female sexual anatomy and methods of achieving sexual satisfaction, was an immediate hit in England and was frequently reprinted". Komödiantin—Dirne? linked the role of actress with that of prostitute, tracing the history of the profession to indecent erotic dances in Greek drama, and arguing actresses were characterised by both infantilism and exhibitionism.

== Works ==
- Weib und Liebe; Studie über das Liebesleben des Weibes. Wien, Leipzig, W. Braumüller [1925]. Translated by Eden and Cedar Paul as Vol. 1. of Women and Love, New York: Boni & Liveright, 1927.
- Wie bist du, Weib? : Betrachtungen über Körper, Seele, Sexualleben und Erotik des Weibes. Wien: Rikola, 1923. Translated by E. S. Jerdan and Norman Haire as Woman, a treatise on the anatomy, physiology, psychology and sexual life of woman, London: Cape, 1926. Reprinted as Vol. 2 of Women and Love, New York: Boni & Liveright, 1927.
- Komödiantin—Dirne? der Künstlerin, Leben und Lieben im Lichte der Wahrheit. Wien: Fiba-Verlag, 1927
