= Heinrich Lahmann =

German physician (1860–1905)

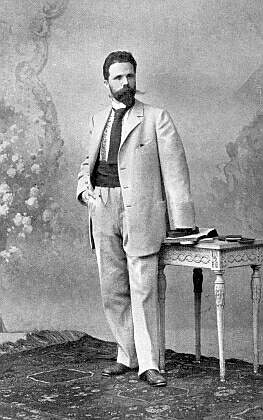
Heinrich Lahmann

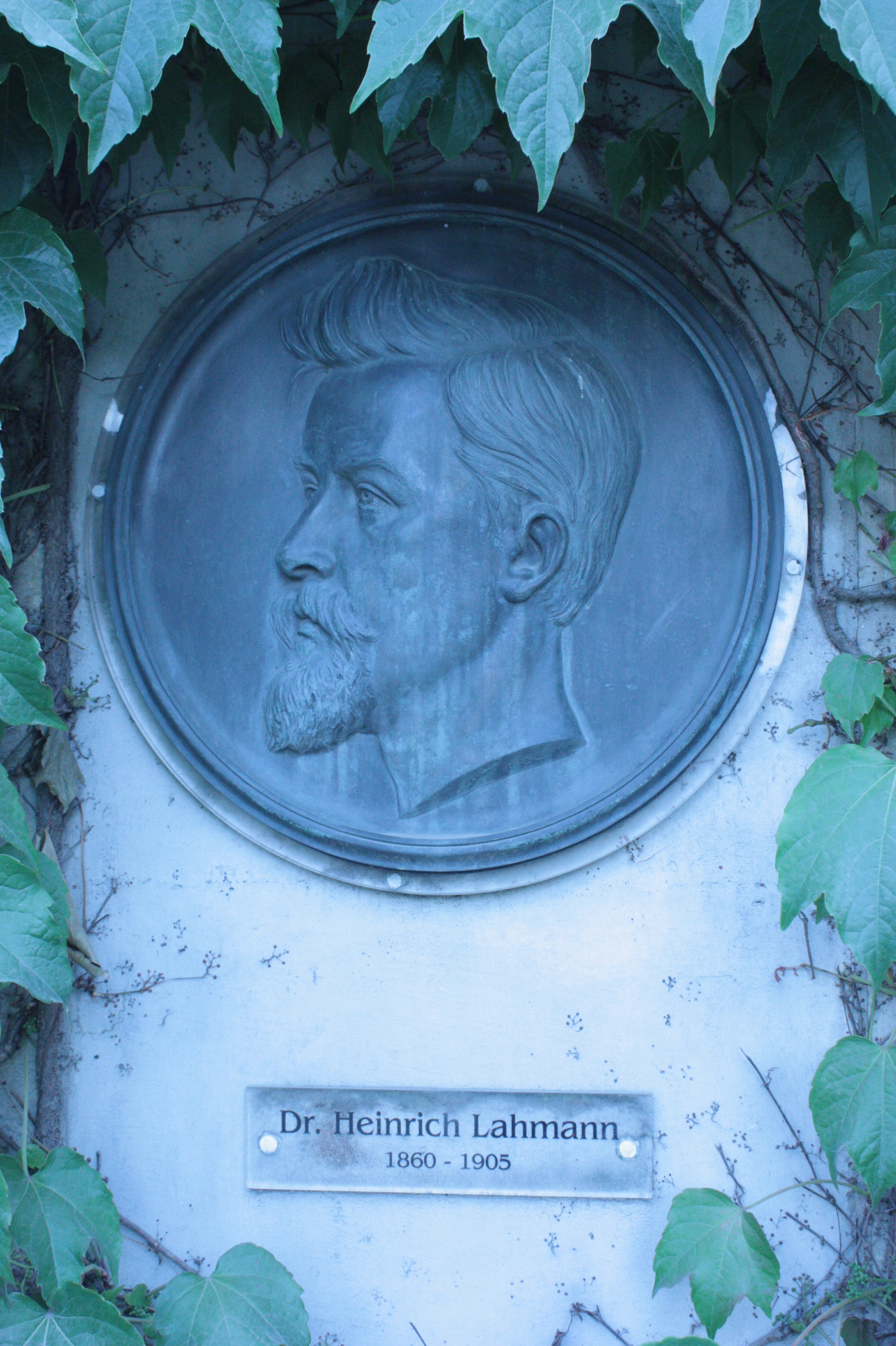
Memorial to Heinrich Lahmann, Dresden

Johann Heinrich Lahmann (30 March 1860 – 1 June 1905) was a German physician who was a pioneer of naturopathic medicine. He was a native of the Free Hanseatic City of Bremen.

He earned his medical doctorate at the University of Heidelberg, and after graduation became a general practitioner in Stuttgart. On 1 January 1888, he opened a sanatorium called the "Physiatric Sanatorium" at Weißer Hirsch, outside of Dresden. This institution would eventually become well-known internationally.

Lahmann was influenced by the methods used by Vincenz Priessnitz (1799-1851) and Johann Schroth (1798-1856), both pioneers in the field of alternative medicine. He eventually turned away from traditional medicine, and was disdainful of drugs and unnatural medications. Lahmann stressed the importance of diet, exercise and fresh air, and was an ardent practitioner of physiotherapy and hydrotherapy.

Lahmann recommended a vegetarian diet of fruits, vegetables, nuts, whole grain bread and dairy products, and believed in limiting one's intake of table salt and liquor. He developed five separate diets for his patients, which included food for diabetics, food for the overweight, as well as a strictly vegetarian diet. In his 1891 book, Diätetische Blutentmischung als Grundursache der Krankheiten, he argued that diseases were ultimately caused by a poor diet, and therefore a proper diet was needed to prevent illness. He was also one of the first physicians to recognize the importance of minerals in an individual's diet, feeling that many foods were mineral deficient.

Lahmann was an advocate of animal rights, refusing to use them in laboratory experiments. He also advocated loose-fitting clothing for all his patients, and recommended both sauna and open-air bathing.

== Selected written works ==
- Das Luftbad als Heil- und Abhärtungsmittel, 1898
- Die Diätetische Blutentmischung als Grundursache der Krankheiten, 1891
- Die Kohlensäurestauung in unserem Körper - die wichtigste allgemeine Krankheitsursache, 1905
