= Antonina Vallentin =

Antonina Vallentin (pseudonym of Antonina Vallentin Luchaire, née Silberstein, born in Lemberg 3 October 1893, dead in Paris 29 August 1957), was a Polish-born biographer, art critic, editor and translator.

== Life ==
While working for the German Foreign Ministry under Gustav Stresemann, Vallentin met H. G. Wells and invited him to deliver an address on world peace to the Reichstag. In 1929 she married the French politician and author Julien Luchaire, whose son Jean was held in high esteem with the German administration during the Nazi occupation, which helped Antonina to escape German and Vichy persecution.

== Works ==
- (tr.) Mein Leben, Selbstbiographie. Translated from the English My Life and Loves by Frank Harris
- Stresemann. Translated by Eric Sutton. With a foreword by Albert Einstein. London: Constable & Co., 1931
- Poet in exile: the life of Heinrich Heine. Translated by Harrison Brown. London: Gollancz, 1934.
- Leonardo da Vinci: the tragic pursuit of perfection. Translated by E. W. Dickes from the German manuscript. New York: Viking Press, 1938.
- Mirabeau. Translated by E. W. Dickes from the French Mirabeau avant la Révolution and Mirabeau dans la Révolution. London: Hamish Hamilton, 1948.
- This I saw: the life and times of Goya. Translated by Katherine Woods from the French. New York: Random House, 1949.
- H. G. Wells, prophet of our day. Translated by Daphne Woodward. New York: J. Day, 1950.
- Einstein: a biography. Translated by Moura Budberg from the French. London: Weidenfeld and Nicolson, 1954.
- El Greco. Translated by Andrew Révai and Robin Chancellor from the French. London: Museum Press, 1954.
- Picasso. Paris: Albin Michel, March 1957 (English translation: London: Cassell, 1963).

== `External links ==
- Vallentin, Antonina (June 15, 1954). "My Marvelous Friend, Dr. Einstein". Maclean's. Archived from the original on November 29, 2018.
