= Theodor Seibert =

German journalist

Theodor Seibert (born 1896) was a German National Socialist journalist and writer. Seibert travelled throughout the Soviet Union from 1926 to 1929 as press representative of the Hamburger Fremdenblatt, the Münchner and the Leipziger Neueste Nachrichten. His book Red Russia criticised Soviet Russia. In the late 1930s Seibert was London correspondent of the Völkischer Beobachter and local head of the German Press Association in London. He was active as an antisemitic propagandist, characterising Bolshevism and 'Rooseveltism' as two aspects of 'international Jewry'.

== Works ==
- Das rote Russland : Staat, Geist und Alltag der Bolschewiki, 1931. Translated by Cedar and Eden Paul as Red Russia, 1932
- Wie sieht uns der Engländer, 1940
- Das amerikanische Rätsel, die Kriegspolitik der USA in der Aera Roosevelt, 1941
