= Emil Ludwig =

German-Swiss author (1881–1948)

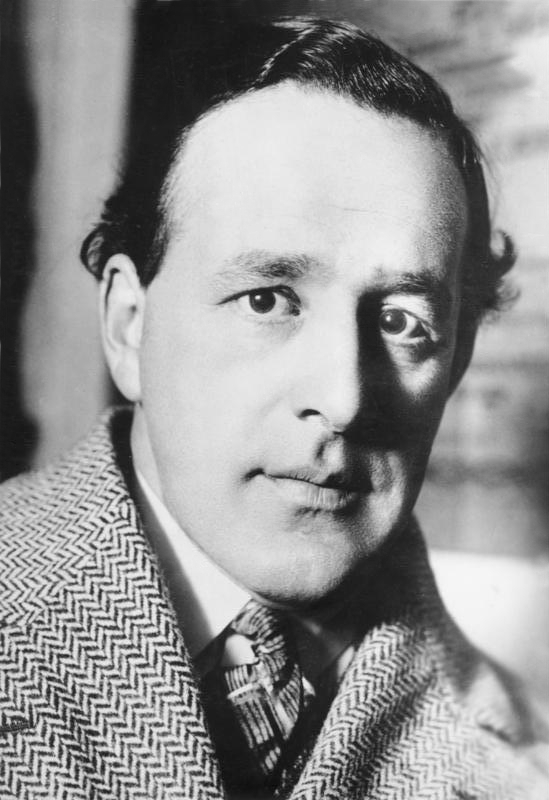
- Born: Emil Cohn; 25 January 1881; Breslau, Kingdom of Prussia, German Empire
- Died: 17 September 1948 (aged 67); Ascona, Switzerland
- Citizenship: German and Swiss
- Occupations: Writer, journalist
- Known for: Writing biographies

Emil Ludwig (25 January 1881 – 17 September 1948) was a German-Swiss author, known for his biographies and study of historical "greats".

== Biography ==
Emil Ludwig (originally named Emil Cohn) was born in Breslau (now part of Poland) on 25 January 1881. Born into a Jewish family, he was raised as a non-Jew but was not baptized. "Many persons have become Jews since Hitler," he said. "I have been a Jew since the murder of Walther Rathenau [in 1922], from which date I have emphasized that I am a Jew." Ludwig studied law but chose writing as a career. At first he wrote plays and novellas, also working as a journalist. In 1906, he moved to Switzerland, but, during World War I, he worked as a foreign correspondent for the Berliner Tageblatt in Vienna and Istanbul. He became a Swiss citizen in 1932, later emigrating to the United States in 1940.

After the 1921 trial of Soghomon Tehlirian for the assassination of Talat Pasha, the main architect of the Armenian genocide, Ludwig wrote, "Only when a society of nations has organized itself as the protector of international order will no Armenian killer remain unpunished, because no Turkish Pasha has the right to send a nation into the desert".

During the 1920s, he achieved international fame for his popular biographies which combined historical fact and fiction with psychological analysis. After his biography of Goethe was published in 1920, he wrote several similar biographies, including one about Bismarck (1922–24) and another about Jesus (1928). As Ludwig's biographies were popular outside of Germany and were widely translated, he was one of the fortunate émigrés who had an income while living in the United States. His writings were considered particularly dangerous by Goebbels, who mentioned him in his journal.

Ludwig interviewed Benito Mussolini and on 1 December 1929 Mustafa Kemal Atatürk. His interview with the founder of the Republic of Turkey appeared in Wiener Freie Presse in March 1930, addressing issues of religion and music. He also interviewed Joseph Stalin in Moscow on 13 December 1931. An excerpt from this interview is included in Stalin's book on Lenin. Ludwig describes this interview in his biography of Stalin.

Ludwig's extended interviews with T.G. Masaryk, founder and longtime president of Czechoslovakia, appeared as Defender of Democracy in 1936.

In 1944, Ludwig wrote a letter to The New York Times where he urged that "Hitler’s fanaticism against the Jews could be exploited by the Allies. The Three Powers should send a proclamation to the German people through leaflets and to the German Government through neutral countries; threatening that further murdering of Jews would involve terrible retaliation after victory. This would drive a wedge into the already existing dissension of the generals and the Nazis, and also between ultra-Nazis and other Germans."

At the end of the Second World War, Ludwig went to Germany as a journalist. In April 1945, he located Goethe's and Schiller's coffins, which local police had removed from Weimar three months before.

In a May 1948 Tempo magazine article, Ludwig theorized that Hitler could have survived by having a body double killed and cremated in his place. The same year, presiding judge at the Einsatzgruppen trial at Nuremberg Michael Musmanno dismissed Ludwig's theory in an article stating his own definitive view that Hitler had died; Musmanno elaborated these opinions in a book two years later.

Ludwig died in his sleep near Ascona in the Swiss canton of Ticino on 17 September 1948.

== French and English editions of works by Ludwig ==
The following French editions of Emil Ludwig's books were published in the period 1926–1940: Biographies: Goethe (3 volumes), Napoléon, Bismarck, Trois Titans, Lincoln, Le Fils de l'Homme, Le Nil (2 volumes). Political works: Guillaume II, Juillet 1914, Versailles, Hindenburg, Roosevelt, Barbares et Musiciens, La Conquête morale de l'Allemagne, Entretiens avec Mussolini, La Nouvelle Sainte-Alliance.

Biographies of Goethe, Napoleon, Bismarck and Wilhelm Hohenzollern are available in English from G. P. Putnam's Sons (New York and London). An English edition of "The Mediterranean", translated by Barrows Mussey, was published by Whittlesey House in 1942.

== Legacy ==
According to Barbel Schrader, Emil Ludwig was "one of the Weimar Republic's big success stories."

== Books ==
- Leaders of Europe, Ivor Nicholson and Watson Ltd. (1934), translated by James Murphy
- Bismarck
- Cleopatra
- Diana
- Genius and Character
- Gifts of Life
- Goethe
- Hindenburg William Heinemann Ltd. (1935), translated by Eden and Cedar Paul
- July '14 (1929)
- Kaiser Wilhelm II: Wilhelm Hohenzollern (1926)
- Nine Etched from Life
- Lincoln
- Napoleon (1922)
- On Mediterranean Shores (1929), translated by Eden and Cedar Paul
- The Practical Wisdom of Goethe
- Schliemann
- Son of Man (Jesus)
- Talks with Mussolini
- Three Titans
- The Davos Murder
- Defender of Democracy
- Masaryk of Czechoslovakia
- The Nile: The Life-Story of a River, The Viking Press (1937), translated by Mary H. Lindsay
- Mackenzie King. A Portrait Sketch (1944)
- Rembrandts Schicksal (1923)
- Three Titans: Michael Angelo, Rembrandt, Beethoven. (1930)
- Wagner: oder Die Entzauberten (F. Lehmann, 1913)
- Otelo
- Bolivar and Napoleon (1939)
- A New Holy Alliance (1938)
- The Mediterranean: Saga of the Sea (1942), translated by

Barrows Mussey

- The Germans (1942), translated by Heinz and Ruth Norden

== See also ==
- Exilliteratur
