= Gino Loria =

Jewish-Italian mathematician and historian of mathematics (1862–1954)

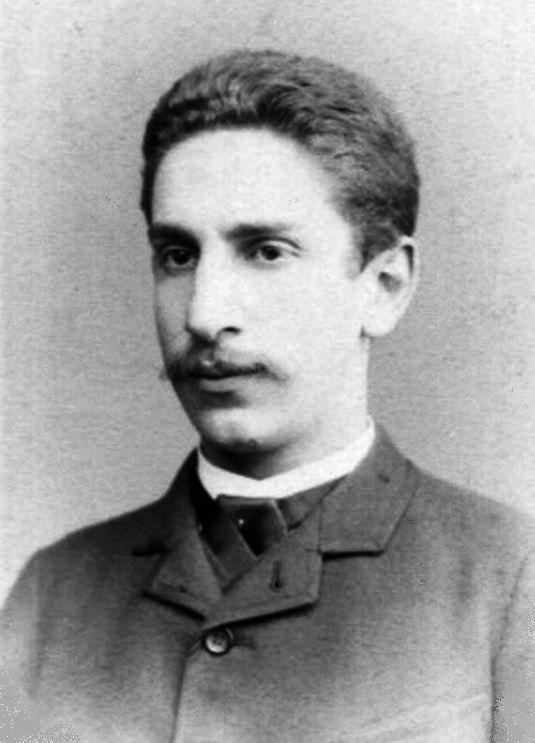
Photograph of Gino Loria

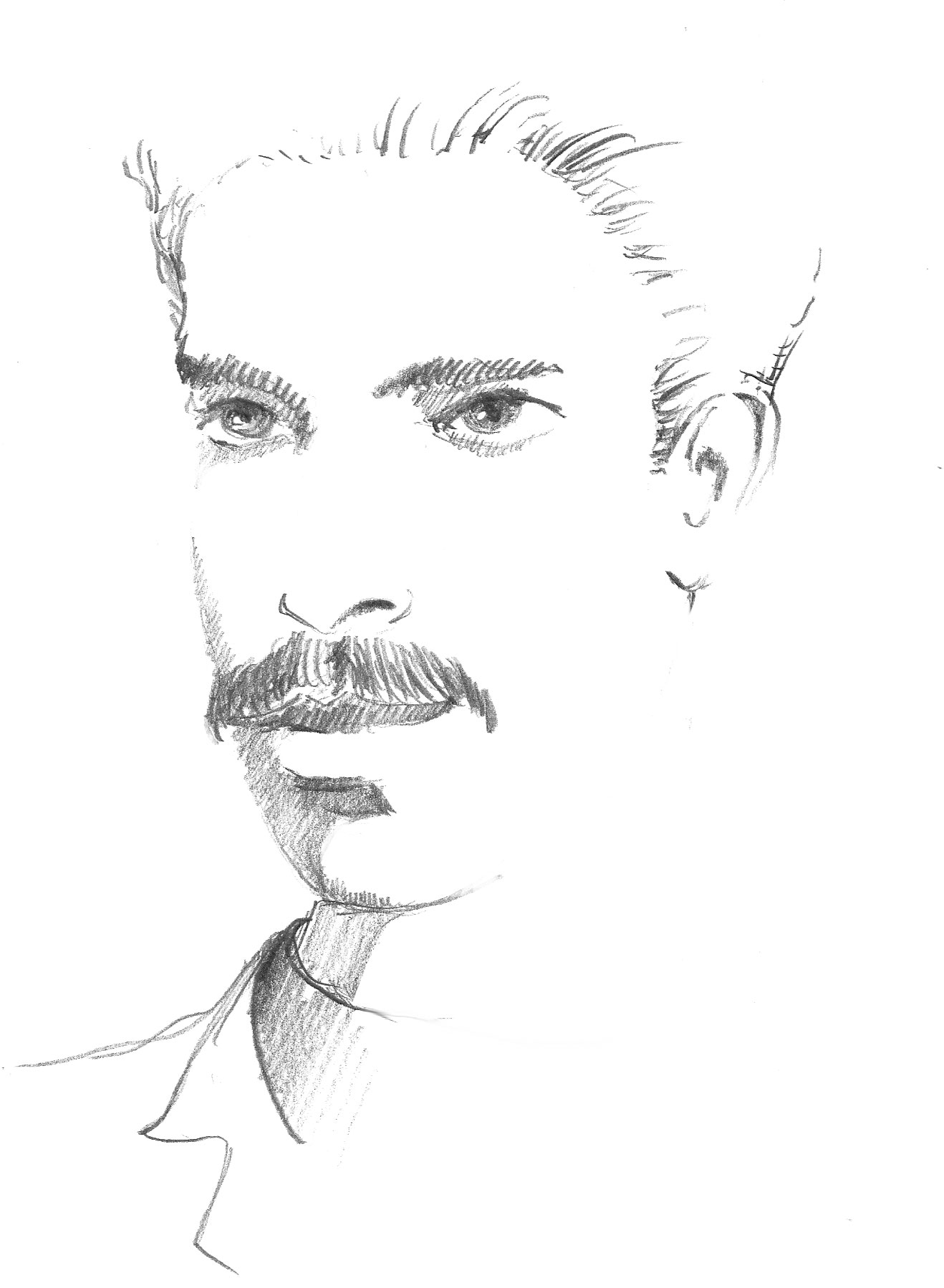
Portrait of Gino Loria in pencil on paper

Gino Benedetto Loria (19 May 1862, Mantua – 30 January 1954, Genoa) was a Jewish-Italian mathematician and historian of mathematics.

== Biography ==
Loria studied mathematics in Mantua, Turin, and Pavia and received his doctorate in 1883 from the University of Turin under the direction of Enrico D'Ovidio. For several years, he was D'Ovidio's assistant in Turin. Starting in 1886, he became, as a result of winning a then-customary competition, Professor for Algebra and Analytic Geometry at the University of Genoa, where he stayed for the remainder of his career.

Loria did research on projective geometry, special curves and rational transformations in algebraic geometry, and elliptic functions. At the International Congress of Mathematicians he was an invited speaker in 1897 in Zürich, 1904 in Heidelberg, in 1908 in Rome, in 1912 in Cambridge, UK, in 1924 in Toronto, in 1928 in Bologna, and in 1932 in Zürich.

In 1897, he became editor of Bolletino di Bibliografia e Storia delle Science Matematiche. In 1916, he published a guide to the study of the history of mathematics. A reviewer noted

The amount of information given is really remarkable, and it is well up to date; the author, too, has not shrunk from the disagreeable duty of pointing out works ... which must be used with caution.

Loria wrote a history of mathematics and was especially concerned with the history of mathematics in Italy and among the ancient Greeks.

After the Germans seized control of Italy in World War II, Waldensians helped Loria (endangered as a Jew) hide in Torre Pellice. Loria was elected to the Accademia dei Lincei and the Turin Academy of Sciences. An asteroid (27056 Ginoloria) is named after him.

== Books ==
- Il passato ed il presente delle principali teorie geometriche, storiae e bibliografia; (1896, 2nd edn., 1907, 3rd edn.; Torino: Carlo Clausen);, 1931, 4th edn., Padova: A. Milani
- Spezielle algebraische und transscendente ebene kurven. Theorie und Geschichte., Leipzig: B. G. Teubner, 1902.
- Curve sghembe speciali algebriche e trascendenti, 2 vols., Bologna, Zanichelli 1925
- Le scienze esatte nell' antica Grecia, Mailand, U. Hoepli, 1914
- Storia della Geometria Descrittiva dalle Origini sino ai Giorni Nostri. (1921, Milano: Ulrico Hoepli)
- Storia delle matematiche dall'alba della civiltà al tramonto del secolo XIX, Mailand, U. Hoepli, 1950, 1st edn. Turin 1929 to 1933 in three vols.
- Vorlesungen über Darstellende Geometrie, 2 vols., Teubner 1907
- Die hauptsachlichsten Theorien der Geometrie in ihrer fruheren und heutigen Entwickelung, Teubner 1907
- with G. Kohn Spezielle ebene algebraische Kurven, Enzyklopädie der mathematischen Wissenschaften
- Spezielle ebene algebraische Kurven von höherer als vierter Ordnung, Enzyklopädie der mathematischen Wissenschaften

== Articles ==
- "The Philosophical Magazine and History of Mathematics" (1916) Mathematical Gazette 8:325–9.
- La scienza nel secolo 18. In: Scientia, 45, 1929, pp. 1–12.
- Lo sviluppo delle matematiche pure durante il secolo 19. Parte 1: La Geometria: dalla geometria descrittiva alla geometria numerativa. In: Scientia, 45, 1929, pp. 225–234.
- Lo sviluppo delle matematiche pure durante il secolo 19. Parte 2: La Geometria: dalla geometria differenziale all'analysis situs. In: Scientia, 45, 1929, pp. 297–306.
- La legge d'evoluzione propria delle matematiche. In: Scientia, 41, 1927, pp. 321–332.

== Sources ==
- Siegfried Gottwald, Hans-Joachim Illgauds, Karl-Heinz Schlote (eds.): Lexikon bedeutender Mathematiker. Bibliographisches Institut, Leipzig 1990, ISBN 3-323-00319-5.

== See also ==
- Achille Loria, his brother
