= Hellmuth Simons =

Hellmuth Simons (1893–1969), who predominantly published under the name H. C. R. Simons, was a German-Jewish bacteriologist and authority on tropical diseases, who encouraged the belief that Germany was developing biological weapons before and during World War II.

Simons worked at I. G. Farben before escaping Germany as a refugee. He provided scientific help to Heinz Liepman for his 1937 book Death from the skies: a study of gas and microbial warfare. When World War II broke out he was working at the Pasteur Institute in Paris, but was offered a chair at a university in Pennsylvania. In autumn 1939 he and his son were interned at Marseille en route to the United States. At some point he visited England, where he reportedly worked at the British Library and in Cambridge, and came to know Wickham Steed. In 1943, when Simons was working at the Zurich Polytechnic Institute, Allen Dulles passed on Simons' fear that Germany would use bacillus botulinus for bacteriological warfare. According to Donald Avery, Simons claimed that I. G. Farben was producing botulin at its plant at Hoechst, at a Berlin laboratory, and elsewhere.

In 1947 Simons started teaching biology at the Philadelphia College of Pharmacy and Science.

The bacterial genus Simonsiella is named after him.
