= Wilhelm-Tietjen-Stiftung für Fertilisation =

The Wilhelm-Tietjen-Stiftung für Fertilisation Ltd. is a controversial fertility research group. Its critics have described it as a far-right extremist organization with links to Neo-Nazism and Nazi eugenics theories. Its proposed purchase of a hotel in the German town of Delmenhorst is the subject of great controversy, and campaigns by local people to keep it out of the town have made the national news in Germany and abroad. The organization manages the assets of former Nazi involved in the Lebensborn project, Wilhelm Tietjen.

== History ==
The Company was incorporated on 21 November 2001 as a private limited company for advertising business under the name Wilhelm Tietjen Foundation for Fertilization Limited with registered office at Vicarage House S44, 58-60 Kensington Church Street, London with registered number 04326557 registered with the Companies House register of companies responsible for this legal form.

The director of the British corporation has been the Hamburg lawyer Jürgen Rieger since November 21, 2001. On 31 January 2005 the registered office was re-registered and moved to 44 Southwark Street, London. On April 15, 2005, he was transferred to Thrale House, London. Contrary to British law, Rieger did not submit an annual report for 2004. After several unsuccessful requests, Companies House removed the company from the UK register on 29 August 2006. The business assets therefore fall to the British crown.

On October 25, 2006, Rieger founded a successor company, the "Wilhelm-Tietjen-Foundation Limited", which is to take over the assets of the deleted company instead of the British crown. The Company's registered office is at the letterbox address 2nd floor, West Thrale House, 44-46 Southwark Street, London. It has the registration number 05977830. The legal situation is unclear. From circles of the German Office for the Protection of the Constitution it was said: "A decision on this could take up to 20 years."
