= Louis Bauer =

Louis Bauer may refer to:

- Louis Agricola Bauer (1865–1932), American geophysicist, astronomer and magnetician
- Louis H. Bauer (1888–1964), American doctor
