= Jenny d'Héricourt =

French feminist and writer (1809–1875)

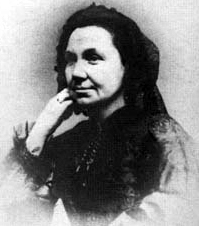
Jenny d'Héricourt

Jenny d'Héricourt (9 September 1809 Besançon, France – 12 January 1875 Saint-Ouen-sur-Seine, France), also Jenny P. d'Héricourt, was a feminist activist, writer, medical doctor and midwife.

She was born Jeanne-Marie-Fabienne Poinsard, in Besançon, France, to Protestant parents. Her father, Jean-Pierre Poinsard, a clock gilder, was born in the town of Héricourt, Haute-Saône, from which Jenny later took her pseudonym. After running a private girls' school, she married Gabriel Marie. However, they soon separated (divorce did not exist under French law at that time). D'Héricourt wrote her first novel, Le Fils du réprouvé ("The son of the reprobate")(1844), under the pseudonym Félix Lamb. She was an enthusiastic supporter of Étienne Cabet, the French socialist, and took part in the Revolution of 1848. She studied medicine privately in Paris in the 1850s, and later practiced midwifery in Paris and Chicago. She lived in the United States from 1863 to 1873 and was active in the feminist movement there also.

D'Hericourt helped develop an unofficial international network of feminists during the first half of the 19th century. They provided each other with moral support and exchanged ideas. She also wrote an influential rebuttal to the sexist essays of the anarchist Pierre-Joseph Proudhon and historian Jules Michelet.
