= Andreas Latzko =

Austro-Hungarian pacifist, novelist and biographer of Jewish origin

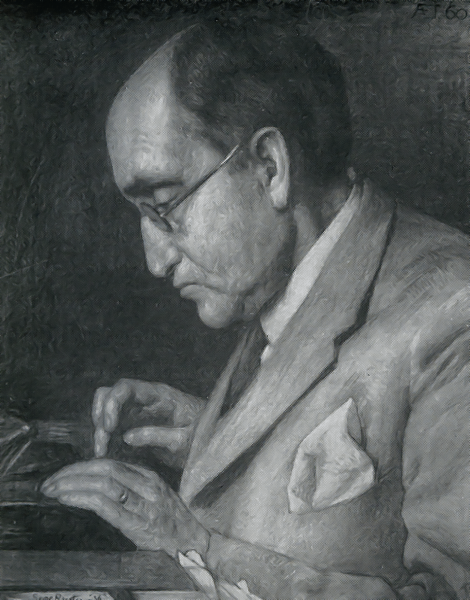
Andreas Latzko

Andreas Latzko (Hungarian: Latzkó Andor; 1 September 1876, in Budapest, Hungary – 11 September 1943, in Amsterdam, Netherlands) was an Austro-Hungarian pacifist of Jewish origin, a novelist and biographer.

== Early life ==
Andreas Latzko attended grammar school and high school in Budapest. After high school, he served in the Austro-Hungarian Army as a one-year volunteer becoming a reserve officer. He then went to Berlin, where he first studied chemistry and then philosophy at the University of Berlin.

== Career beginnings ==
Latzko wrote his first literary works in Hungarian. His first in German, a one-act play, was published in Berlin. He also worked as a journalist, traveling to Egypt, India, Ceylon and Java.

== World War I and its aftermath ==
In August 1914, at the beginning of World War I, he returned to Egypt and served as an officer in the Imperial and Royal Army of Austria-Hungary. With the beginning of the war between Italy and Austria-Hungary, he was sent to the front on the Isonzo River. He fell ill with malaria, but he was not sent away from the front until he suffered a severe shock from a heavy Italian artillery attack near Gorizia.

After eight months in the hospital, he moved at the end of 1916 to the Swiss resort town of Davos for further recuperation and rehabilitation. While there he wrote six chapters of his book Men in War, which deals with the Great War at the River Isonzo front. In 1917, the book was first published anonymously in Zurich by Rascher-Verlag. Karl Kraus wrote in his magazine Die Fackel (pub. 1899–1936) about this book being "a scream ... a most relevant document" about the Great War and humanity. Some people "know the day is not so far off, when the officials of Austria will be proud to be involved into the world war by that book, too." The book was a great success and translated into 19 languages. However, every country involved in the war banned it, and the army supreme command demoted Latzko.

In 1918 the book was printed again in an edition of 33,000 copies. It was widely praised, with one critic describing the novel's theme of "disillusionment and an almost morbid sympathy with mental and physical suffering" as well as "a prevailing nihilistic tone". The New York Times said it was "a bitter attack upon the by-products of the Teutonic military idea."

While in Switzerland, Latzko met Romain Rolland and Stefan Zweig.

Latzko wrote and published two more novels in 1918: The Judgement of Peace, about the lives of German soldiers on the Western Front, and The Wild Man. That same year, he wrote the text Women in War for the International Women’s Conference in Bern.

== Life in Germany ==
With the end of the war in 1918, Latzko moved to Munich and followed the Bavarian republic of Gustav Landauer. He was expelled from Bavaria and moved to Salzburg, where he met Georg Friedrich Nicolai during the latter's visit to Stefan Zweig. Nicolai had published a book in 1917, The Biology of War, that Latzko admired. In Salzburg, Latzko worked as a journalist and wrote articles for several newspapers.

== Later career and death ==
In 1929, his novel Seven Days was published. He moved to Amsterdam in 1931. In 1933, the Hitler regime ordered his books burned. He lived in Amsterdam at Cliostraat. He died there in 1943. He is buried at Zorgvlied, in the same grave as his wife who died in 1965. In 1948, a monument was placed upon his grave, designed by sculptor Jan Havermans. His grave at the Zorgvlied cemetery in Amsterdam was due to be abandoned in October 2021.

== Literary works ==
- Hans im Glück, play (comedy). Date of publication unknown.
- Der Roman der Herrn Cordé, novel. Date of publication unknown.
- Apostel, play (comedy). Date of publication unknown.
- Menschen im Krieg (1918, translated by Adele Seltzer (Szold) as Men in War), novel. Rascher-Verlag, Zürich 1917.
- Friedensgericht (1918, translated as The Judgement of Peace), novel. Rascher-Verlag, Zürich 1918.
- Der wilde Mann (The Wild Man), novel. Rascher-Verlag Zürich 1918.
- Frauen im Krieg (Women in War), essay. Rascher-verlag Zürich 1918.
- Sieben Tage (Seven Days), novel. 1931.
- Marcia Reale. Malik-Verlag, Berlin 1932.
- Lafayette (1935), English translation by E. W. Dickes as Lafayette: A Soldier of Liberty, Methuen, London, 1936.
