= Hugo Ribbert =

German pathologist

(Moritz Wilhelm) Hugo Ribbert (1 March 1855 in Hohenlimburg – 6 November 1920 in Bonn) was a German professor of pathology.

Ribbert studied at Bonn, Berlin and Strassburg. In 1883 he was appointed Professor extraordinarius at Bonn. In 1892 he became professor at Zurich. In 1900 he moved to Marburg University; in 1903 he moved to Göttingen University; and in 1905 he returned to Bonn.

An 1881 conference report of Ribbert is considered to be the first description of cells infected with the cytomegalovirus. In 1905 Ribbert proposed an embryonal origin for cancer (Cohnheim-Ribbert theory of cancer).

== Works ==
- Lehrbuch der pathologischen Histologie für Studirende und Aerzte , 1896
- Die Lehren vom Wesen der Krankheiten in ihrer geschichtlichen Entwicklung, 1899
- Lehrbuch der allgemeinen Pathologie und der pathologischen Anatomie, 1901
- Lehrbuch der speciellen Pathologie und der speciellen pathologischen Anatomie, 1902
- Geschwulstlehre für Aerzte und Studierende, 1904
- Das Wesen der Krankheit, 1909
- Das Karzinom des Menschen, sein Bau, sein Wachstum, seine Entstehung, 1911
- Die Bedeutung der Krankheiten für die Entwicklung der Menschheit, 1912
