= Johann Schroth =

Austrian physician (1798–1856)

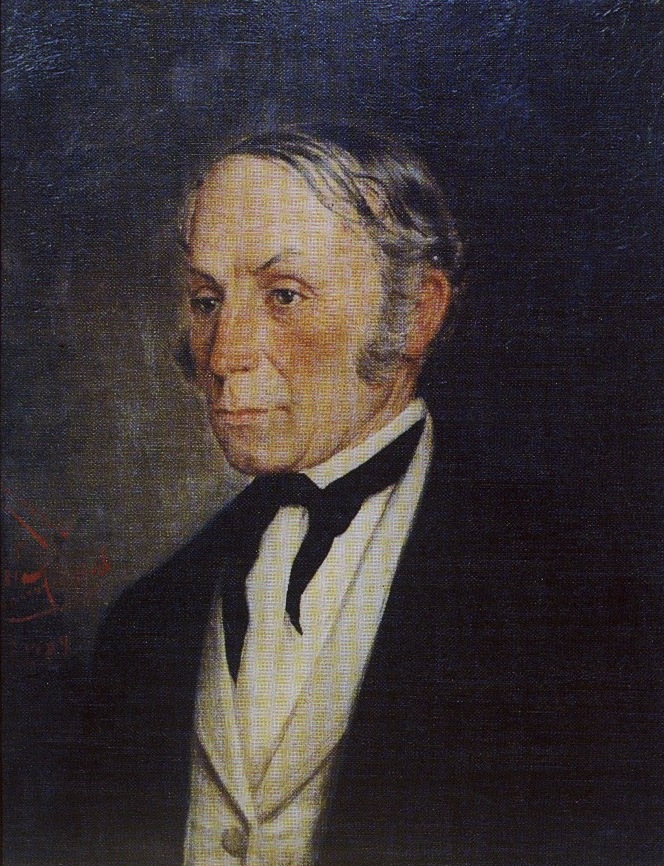
Johann Schroth

Johann Schroth (February 11, 1798 in Böhmischdorf, Silesia, today Česká Ves, Czech Republic – March 26, 1856 in Lipová-lázně) was an Austrian naturopath.

Schroth was an early advocate of fasting and moist heat therapy. He was a haulage contractor by trade, and had vast experience dealing with horses. At age 18, his knee was badly injured by a horse and he successfully treated the affliction using cold compresses. Initially, he met a monk who advised him to wash his stiff joint with wet cloths several times a day. But as Schroth became tired of the repetitious activity, he developed a method of "wearing" cold compresses for several hours before changing them. Ultimately, the stiffness went away. Now being aware of the effectiveness of the newfound method, he started using compresses for wounds, bruises, swellings, and stiffness of the joints for both humans and animals.

He acquired a reputation as a healer of domestic animals, and subsequently used this treatment on injured humans. Later he introduced steam baths and full-body wraps for individuals without injuries as a means of naturopathic healing. From observations of sick animals that refused to eat, Schroth developed the idea of an austere diet for humans that included a regimen of "dry and drinkable days". Soon his curative methodology of cold wraps, steam and diet was touted as a means of purification and detoxification of the entire body, physical and mental.

Some people considered Schroth a "miracle worker" during his lifetime, and others thought him to be a charlatan, including several influential physicians. During the 19th century there was a dispute between supporters of Schroth and followers of hydrotherapist Vincenz Priessnitz (1799–1851), as to which naturopathic system was superior.

Around 1830 Schroth founded a health spa at Bad Lindewiese that gradually grew in importance as a cold water spa. After his death the business was taken over by his son, Emmanuel Schroth (1832–1890), who moderated his father's extreme regimen, and in doing so, increased the number of persons seeking the Schrothkur. Today, the "Schroth Cure" is still practiced in Europe and elsewhere.
