= Paul Stefan =

Austrian music historian (1879–1943)

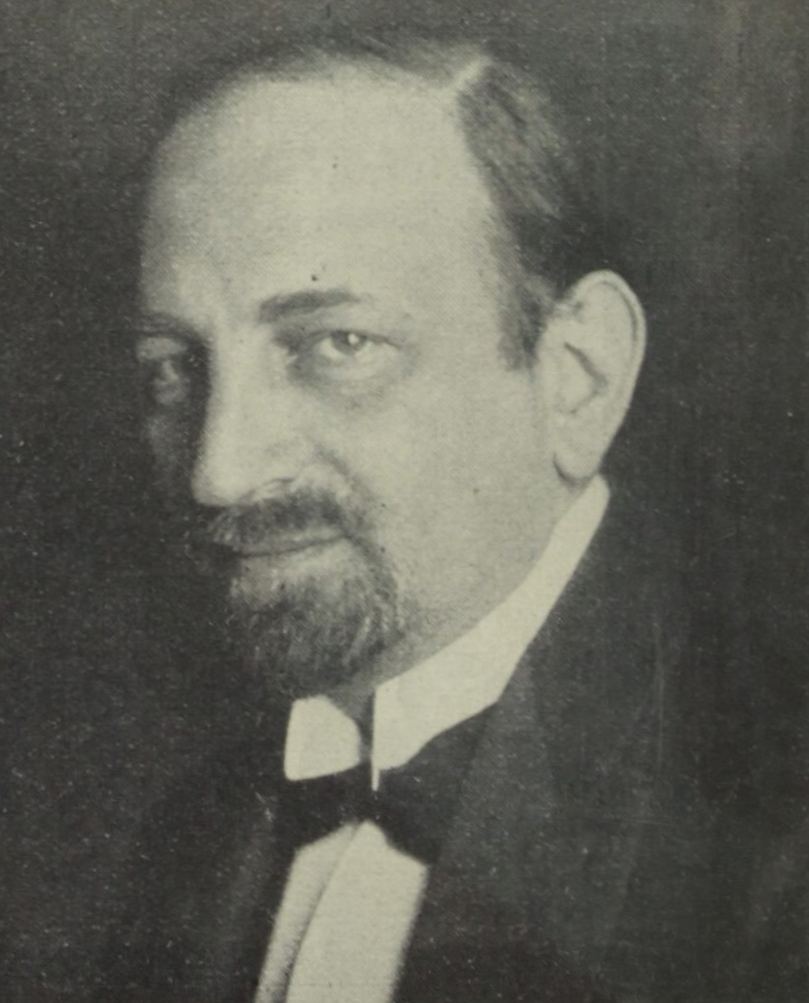
- Born: Paul Stefan Grünfeld; 25 November 1879; Brno, Austria-Hungary (now Czech Republic)
- Died: 12 November 1943 (aged 63); New York City, USA
- Occupations: Music historian, critic
- Notable work: Editor of Musikblätter des Anbruch

Paul Stefan, born Paul Stefan Grünfeld (25 November 1879 – 12 November 1943) was an Austrian music historian and critic.

Born into an assimilated Jewish family, Stefan came to live in Vienna in 1898. He attended courses in law, philosophy, and art history at the University of Vienna before studying music theory with Hermann Graedener and possibly composition under Arnold Schoenberg. From 1922 to 1937, he edited the Austrian music journal Musikblätter des Anbruch (entitled simply Anbruch from 1929 onward).

== Works ==
- Gustav Mahler; eine studie über persönlichkeit und werk, Münich: R. Piper & Co., 1910. Translated to English as Gustav Mahler: a study of his personality and work, 1913.
- Arturo Toscanini, 1927
- Anton Dvořák, 1939
- Verdi, the man in his letters, 1942
