= Soviet Russia (disambiguation) =

Soviet Russia (Russian: Советская Россия), or the Russian Soviet Federative Socialist Republic, was an independent state (1917–1922), later a republic of the Soviet Union (1922–1991).

Soviet Russia may also refer to:

- Soviet Union (1922–1991), sometimes also called Soviet Russia

== Exhibitions ==
- Soviet Russia (exhibition, 1960)
- Soviet Russia (exhibition, 1965)
- Soviet Russia (exhibition, 1967)
- Soviet Russia (exhibition, 1975)

== Other uses ==
- Soviet Russia, a magazine of the Friends of Soviet Russia in the United States in the 1920s
- Sovetskaya Rossiya (Soviet Russia), a Soviet and Russian newspaper since 1956

== See also ==
- Russia
- Russian Republic (1917)
- In Soviet Russia, joke cycle sometimes called the "Russian Reversal"
