= René Fülöp-Miller =

Austrian cultural historian and writer

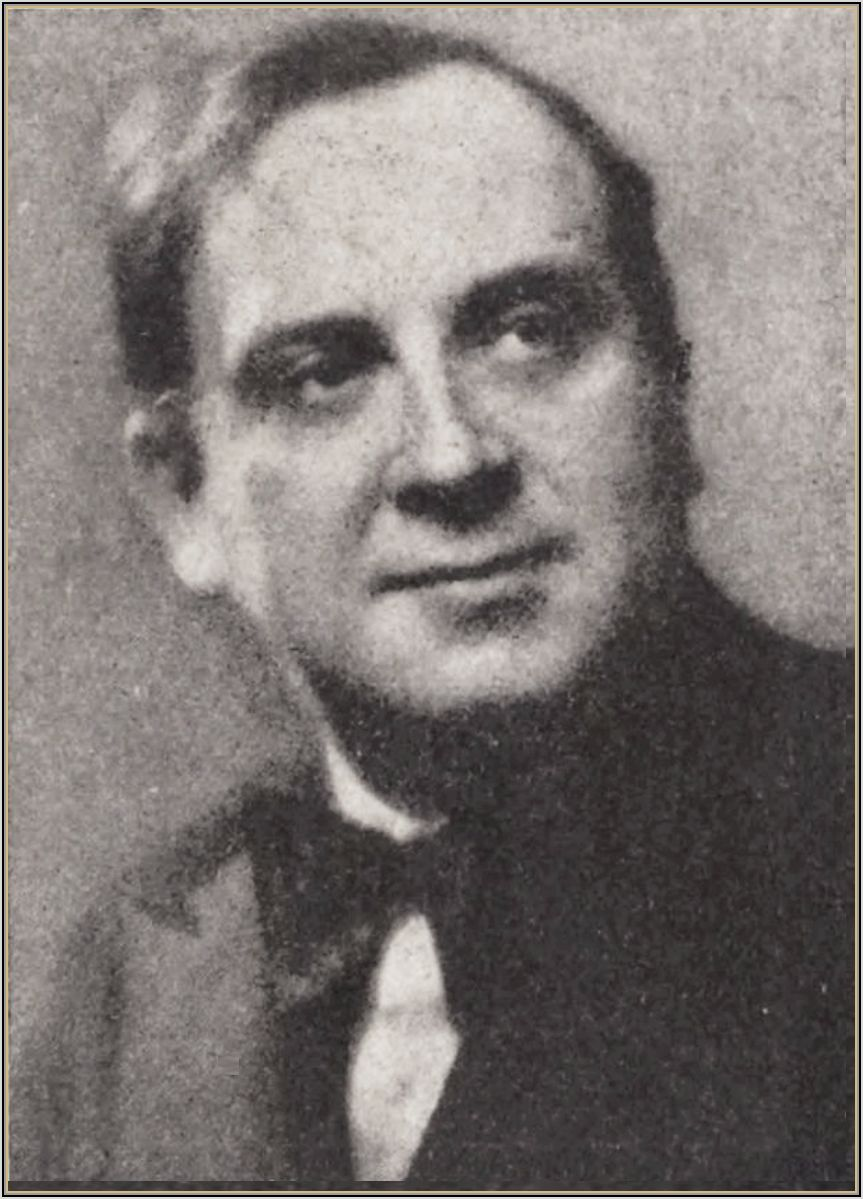
- Fülöp-Miller in 1934
- Born: Philip René Maria Müller; February 17, 1881; Karánsebes, Austria-Hungary (now Caransebeş, Romania)
- Died: May 17, 1963 (aged 82); Hanover, New Hampshire, U.S.
- Occupation: Writer
- Years active: 1918-1964

René Fülöp-Miller, born Philip René Maria Müller (17 February 1891 – 17 May 1963) was an Austrian cultural historian and writer. He was born to an Alsatian immigrant and a Serbian mother in Karánsebes, Austria-Hungary (now Caransebeş, Romania) and died in Hanover, New Hampshire.

== Early life ==
His father was a pharmacist and his mother was born a Brancovič, a family which played an important role in the military border region of southeastern Banat.

He studied pharmacy, anatomy and psychiatry in Vienna, Berlin, Paris and Lausanne from 1909 to 1912. His teachers included Forel, Babinski and Freud. After his study, he worked in his father's pharmacy, but did not stay long. During the First World War he served on the Russian front. At this time he met the well-known Budapest opera singer Hedy Bendiner and married her.

== Career ==
After the First World War, he worked as a journalist in various languages: he wrote in Hungarian for newspapers in Budapest and Brassó, he published German articles in Nagyszeben and Temesvár, and in Bucharest he worked for a respected Romanian press.

Curiosity and a thirst for knowledge led him to the Soviet Union to study its cultural life. His first success as an author was with The Mind and Face of Bolshevism: An Examination of Cultural Life in Soviet Russia, published originally in German in 1926. This book is notable for the fact that at this date, Stalin does not appear to figure at all in the cultural life of the USSR. The book is still relevant as a deep analysis of a state-censored culture. He followed this book with two more in quick succession, Lenin and Gandhi and Rasputin: The Holy Devil. The first book contrasted the violent revolutionary and the peaceful rebel and the second, the contradiction of a holy man who was a magnet for women. His most successful book was The Power and Secret of the Jesuits, which was still being reprinted after 1945. Through his travels in Europe and his work in renowned newspapers and on radio throughout the German speaking areas, Fülöp-Miller became a respected author in the time of the Weimar Republic.

In the 1930s, he went into self-imposed exile in America. He defined "Americanism" as a counter-cultural spirit to the world of faith. In Die Fantasiemaschine: Eine Saga der Gewinnsucht ["The Fantasy Machine: A Saga of Greed"] (1931), together with Joseph Gregor, he looked at the history of American theatre and cinema for evidence of the distorted image of the consumer world. This theme was continued in his English language essay, Dehumanization in Modern Society (1955).

His first work of fiction was Katzenmusik ["Caterwauling"] (dated 1936 but 1935; trans Richard Winston as Sing, Brat, Sing 1947), a satirical tale of a four year old musical prodigy. His later fiction includes The Night of Time (trans Richard and Clara Winston from manuscript 1955) and The Silver Bacchanal (trans Richard and Clara Winston from manuscript 1960), two surreal tales set in the fictional city of Drohitz.

He gave lectures on the history of European culture at Dartmouth College in Hanover and Hunter College in New York. Like many authors of the Weimar Republic and the exile generation, he has long disappeared from the public memory.

== Works ==
- Rasputin: The Holy Devil, 1927
- The Mind and Face of Bolshevism: An Examination of Cultural Life in Soviet Russia, 1927
- The Russian Theatre: Its Character and History with Special Reference to the Revolutionary Period, 1927
- Lenin and Gandhi, 1927
- (ed. with Friedrich Eckstein) The Diary of Dostoyevsky's Wife, 1928
- The Power and Secret of the Jesuits, 1930
- The Ochrana: The Russian Secret Police, 1930
- (ed.) New Light on Tolstoy: Literary Fragments, Letters and Reminiscences not Previously Published, Issued under the Authority of the Tolstoy family, 1931
- (ed.) Under Three Tsars: The Memoirs of the Lady-in-Waiting, Elizabeth Narishkin-Kurakin, 1931
- Leo XIII and Our Times: Might of the Church-power in the World, 1935
- Leaders, Dreamers, and Rebels; an Account of the Great Mass-movements of History and the Wish-dreams that Inspired Them, 1935
- Katzenmusik ["Caterwauling"] (trans Richard Winston as Sing, Brat, Sing 1947), 1936
- Triumph over Pain, 1938
- The Saints that Moved the World: Anthony, Augustine, Francis, Ignatius, Theresa, 1945
- Fyodor Dostoevsky: Insight, Faith, and Prophecy, 1950
- The Night of Time, 1955
- The Silver Bacchanal, 1960
- The Jesuits: A History of the Society of Jesus, 1963
