= Achille Loria =

Italian political economist (1857–1943)

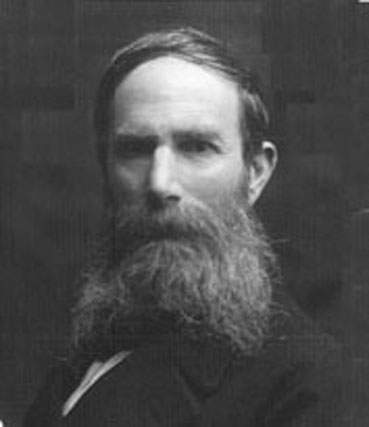
- Born: 2 March 1857; Mantua, Kingdom of Lombardy–Venetia, Austrian Empire
- Died: 6 November 1943 (aged 86); Luserna San Giovanni, Kingdom of Italy
- Occupation: Political economist
- Relatives: Gino Loria (brother)

Achille Loria (2 March 1857 – 6 November 1943) was an Italian political economist.

He was educated at the lyceum of his native city and the universities of Bologna, Pavia, Rome, Berlin, and London and graduated at the University of Bologna (1877). He became professor of political economy in the University of Siena in 1881; and he held a similar appointment in the University of Padua (1891–1903), and University of Torino (1903–1932). He was elected to the Accademia dei Licei (1901) and appointed to the Italian Senate in 1919. His work draws on a wide range of predecessors: Karl Marx, Herbert Spencer, Charles Darwin, Adolph Wagner and Luigi Cossa, who was his teacher. With this background and on the basis of research on landholding in the British Museum, he developed an original deterministic theory of economic development. It is based on the premise that the relative scarcity of land leads to the subjugation of some members of society by others, a mechanism that works differently in different stages of development. This concept was developed in a large number of books, many of which were translated into foreign languages. They had indirectly influenced their interpretation of American history. Achille Loria is also seen as a forerunner of socio-legal studies (see International Institute for the Sociology of Law).

Loria was one of the earliest critics of Marx's ideas, and as such his views were ridiculed by Friedrich Engels, Georgi Plekhanov and Antonio Gramsci.

== English language bibliography ==
- Achille Loria, The Economic Foundations of Society, London: Sonnenschein 1904.
- Achille Loria, Contemporary Social Problems, London: Sonnenschein 1911
- Achille Loria, The Economic Synthesis: A Study of the Laws of Income, London: Allen and Unwin, 1914
- Lee Benson, Turner and Beard: American Historical Writing Reconsidered. Glencoe, Ill.: Free Press, 1950 (see pages 2–40 on "Achille Loria's influence on American Economic thought").
