= Heinz Liepmann =

German writer (1905–1966)

Max Heinz Liepmann (27 August 1905 – 6 June 1966) was a German writer and journalist. Liepmann was born in Osnabrück, Province of Hanover, Prussia, and died in Agarone, Ticino, Switzerland.

== Bibliography ==
- Fires Underground (1936)
- Nights of an Old Child (1937). Translated by A. Lynton Hudson. Philadelphia: J.B. Lippincott Company.
- Murder--Made in Germany.
- Wanderers in the Mist.
- Peace Broke Out.
