= Eden Paul =

English physician, translator and communist activist (1865–1944)

Maurice Eden Paul (27 September 1865, in Sturminster Marshall – 1 December 1944) was a British socialist activist, physician, writer and translator.

== Early life ==
Paul was the younger son of the publisher Charles Kegan Paul, and Margaret Colvile. His mother was one of 12 daughters born to Andrew Wedderburn-Colvile (1779–1856) and the Hon. Mary Louisa Eden, fifth daughter of William Eden, 1st Baron Auckland.

He was educated at University College School and University College London; he continued his medical studies at London Hospital. In the mid-1880s he helped Beatrice Webb and Ella Pycroft run Katharine Buildings, model dwellings that were the first project of the philanthropically-motivated East End Dwellings Company, and in 1886 joined Charles Booth's Board of Statistical Inquiry investigating poverty in London.

In 1890, he married Margaret Jessie Macdonald, née Boag, a ward sister at the London Hospital. From 1892–4, he taught at a university in Japan, where his daughter Hester was born in 1893.

== Journalism ==
He travelled with the Japanese army as a Times correspondent during the First Sino-Japanese War of 1895. Between 1895 and 1912, he practised medicine in Japan, China, Perak, Singapore, Alderney and England. He was the founder and editor of the Nagasaki Press, 1897–99.

By 1903, the family had moved to Alderney, where his wife later established a private nursing home; however, the couple separated about this time. From 1907 to 1919, he was a member of the ILP where he promoted eugenics, and worked for the French Socialist Party from 1912 to 1914. He later joined the Communist Party of Great Britain (CPGB). He remained active in the CPGB at least until 1928.

== Later years ==
In 1932 he retired to live on the French Riviera. In 1939, aged 74, he was badly injured in a motor accident near Grasse. With his second wife, Cedar Paul (real name Gertrude Mary Davenport) he wrote several books for a socialist reading public, and they also worked together to translate from German, French, Italian and Russian.

== Works ==
=== Translations undertaken with Cedar Paul ===
- The ABC of Communism by Nikolai Bukharin and Yevgeni Preobrazhensky London: The Communist Party of Great Britain
- Napoléon by Emil Ludwig. New York, N.Y. : Boni & Liveright, 1926
- Bismarck; the story of a fighter by Emil Ludwig. Boston: Little, Brown and Co., 1927
- The Son of man: the story of Jesus by Emil Ludwig. New York: Boni & Liveright, 1928
- Capital, by Karl Marx. Translated from the 4th German edition of Das Kapital. London: Allen & Unwin, 1928
- Karl Marx: his Life and Work by Otto Ruhle. New York: Viking/London: Allen & Unwin, 1929
- Lincoln by Emil Ludwig. Boston: Little, Brown and Co., 1930
- Joseph Fouché, the portrait of a politician by Stefan Zweig. New York: Viking Press, 1930
- Marie Antoinette, the portrait of an average woman by Stefan Zweig. New York: Viking Press, 1933
- Bula Matari: Stanley, conqueror of a continent by Jakob Wassermann. New York, Liveright Inc., 1933
- Erasmus of Rotterdam by Stefan Zweig. New York: Viking Press, 1934
- Mary, Queen of Scotland and the Isles by Stefan Zweig. New York: Viking Press, 1935
- Arturo Toscanini by Paul Stefan. New York: Viking Press, 1936
- Insulted and exiled : the truth about the German Jews by Stefan Zweig. London: John Mills, 1937
- Racism by Magnus Hirschfeld, 1938
- Imperial Byzantium by Bertha Diener. Boston: 1938 Translates Byzanz, von Kaisern, Engeln und Eunuchen, Leipzig, 1937.
- Triumph over pain by René Fülöp-Miller. New York, Bobbs-Merrill Co., 1938
- Conqueror of the seas; the story of Magellan by Stefan Zweig. New York: Viking Press, 1938

Other works

- (ed.) Lectures on pathology: delivered at the London Hospital by Henry Gawen Sutton, revised by Samuel Wilks. London: J. & A. Churchill; Philadelphia: Blakiston, 1891.
- (tr. with Peter Galstann Edgar) Introduction to the study of Malarial Diseases by Reinhold Ruge. London: Rebman Limited, 1903.
- (tr.) An atlas of human anatomy for students and physicians by Carl Toldt. London: Rebman, 1903–. Translated from the 3rd German ed. and adapted to English and American and international terminology.
- (tr.) The sexual life of our time in its relations to modern civilisation by Iwan Bloch. London: Rebman, 1908. Translated from the sixth German edition.
- Karl Marx and modern socialism, Manchester: National Labour Press, [1908?]
- 'Socialism and Science', Socialist Review, April 1909. Reprinted Keighley: Wadsworth & Co., [1909.] An address to the members of the Poole and Branksome Branch of the Independent Labour Party, Sunday, 24 January 1909.
- Psychical research and thought transference: their meaning and recent history, London: Watts & Co., 1911. Issues for the Rationalist Press Association.
- Socialism and eugenics, Manchester: National Labour Press, [1911]. Reprinted from the Labour Leader.
- Cesare Lombroso: a modern man of science by Hans Kurella. London: Rebman, 1911. Translated from the German.
- (tr.) Sexual life of the Child by Albert Moll. London, 1912. Translated from the German. With an introduction by Edward L. Thorndike
- (tr.) The elements of child-protection by Sigmund Engel. New York: Macmillan, 1912. Translated from the German.
- The Sexual life of woman in its physiological, pathological and hygienic aspects by E. Heinrich Kisch. London; printed in America: William Heinemann, [1913?]. The only authorised translation from the German.
- (tr.) The economic synthesis : a study of the laws of income by Achille Loria, London: George Allen, 1914. Translated from the Italian.
- (with Cedar Paul) Independent working class education : thoughts and suggestions. London: Workers' Socialist Federation, 1918
- (with Cedar Paul) Bolshevism in industry and politics: new tactics for the social revolution, London: London Workers' Committee, 1918.
- (with Cedar Paul) Creative revolution : a study of communist ergatocracy, London: Plebs League, 1920
- (with Cedar Paul) Proletcult (proletarian Culture), New York: T. Seltzer, Incorporated, 1921
- 'Steinach's rejuvenation experiments', in E. Paul & Norman Haire, Rejuvenation: Steinach's researches on the sex-glands, London: Athenaeum Press, 1923
- Chronos. London : Kegan Paul, Trench, Trubner, 1930
