= Political obligation =

Concept in moral philosophy and political science

Political obligation refers to a moral requirement to obey national laws. It is distinct from other reasons and incentives to obey laws, such as avoiding punishment and the imposition of costs by the government. Political obligation is distinct from legal obligation.

British philosopher Isaiah Berlin described the question central to political obligation, "Why should anyone obey anyone else?", as "perhaps the most fundamental of all political questions." John Rawls's 1971 work A Theory of Justice has been credited with putting political obligation at the forefront of academic focus in contemporary political philosophy.

== History ==
The idea of political obligation was renewed by Thomas Hill Green around the late 1800s. Green discussed the idea as "obedience to the law." A more detailed look at the term can be traced to Socrates and Plato. Dudley Knowles considered the topic in his book Political Obligation: A Critical Introduction.

The idea of political obligation is philosophical, focusing on the morality of laws, rather than justice. Discussion of political obligation grew during the era of social contract theory, in which Thomas Hobbes and John Locke were crucial in explaining the idea and its importance.

During the Enlightenment period, the concept of political obligation developed more and more as philosophers started to question where the authority and political legitimacy of state power came from. Thomas Hobbes argued that individuals should give up their rights to a sovereign (ruler) for order and stability. On the other hand, John Locke emphasized that governments are only legitimate if they protect an individuals natural rights to life, liberty, and property. Locke was more in favor of individual rights and protections. Also, citizens have the right to revolt if those rights are violated. This debate between absolute authority and control of power is still very relevant in discussions today around political philosophy.

=== Socrates ===
The earliest understanding of political obligation can be traced back to the teachings of Socrates. One account recalls his imprisonment and death sentence for "corrupting the morals of the youth". Instead of escaping, he chose to stay and accept his punishment, as he found it morally wrong to evade his punishment. In Crito, Socrates describes the struggle man has with the rule of law and the connection it has with political obligation.

== Divinity and morality ==
One claim is that the obligations of an individual to society is divinely ordained. Christianity has been a catalyst in this thinking. This requires acceptance of the existence of the divine and the linkage between the divine and the political realms are clear.

== Social contract ==
Hobbes believed that society needed authority in order to thrive. More specifically, he saw it as a fight among humans to wield power. Hobbes accepted the idea of political obligation, stating that government and laws were needed to thrive as a society. Hobbes and Locke agreed on the idea of individual freedom. They both saw that this freedom was limited and accompanied by an obligation to obey the law.
