= Rational-legal authority =

Form of leadership

Rational-legal authority, also known as rational authority, legal authority, rational domination, legal domination, or bureaucratic authority, is a form of leadership in which the authority of an organization or a ruling regime is largely tied to legal rationality, legal legitimacy and bureaucracy. The majority of the modern states of the 20th and 21st centuries are rational-legal authorities, according to those who use this form of classification. Scholars such as Max Weber and Charles Perrow characterized the rational-legal bureaucracy as the most efficient form of administration. Critics challenge whether rational-legal authority is as rational and unbiased as presented, as well as challenge that it is effective.

== Rational-legal authority ==
In sociology, the concept of rational-legal domination comes from Max Weber's tripartite classification of authority (one of several classifications of government used by sociologists); the other two forms being traditional authority and charismatic authority. All of those three domination types represent an example of his ideal type concept. Weber noted that in history those ideal types of domination are always found in combinations. In traditional authority, the legitimacy of the authority comes from tradition. Charismatic authority is legitimized by the personality and leadership qualities of the ruling individual. Finally, rational-legal authority derives its powers from the system of bureaucracy and legality.

== Legal rationality and legitimate authority ==
Under rational-legal authority, legitimacy is seen as coming from a legal order and the laws that have been enacted in it (see also natural law and legal positivism). Weber defined legal order as a system where the rules are enacted and obeyed as legitimate because they are in line with other laws on how they can be enacted and how they should be obeyed. Further, they are enforced by a government that monopolizes their enactment and the legitimate use of physical force. If society, as a whole, approves the exercise of the power in a certain way, then the power is considered "legitimate authority".

== Max Weber's theory: type of authority ==
Weber broke down legitimate authority into three different types of societies: traditional authority, rational-legal authority, and charismatic authority. Each of these authorities have their own unique complex societies that have evolved from simple definitions.

=== Traditional authority: traditional grounds ===
- It is the type of power that has been around longer, and is traditionally rooted in beliefs and the practices of society. This authority is liked by many individuals for two main reasons: the inheritance of past generations and religiousness that the societies have.
- Traditional authority is based on a tradition or custom that is followed by the traditional leaders. In traditional authority, status is a key concept. There are no requirements to serving as a traditional leader but there are no salaries. The consequences to traditional authority are discouragement of education and rational calculation.
- Traditional authority consists of a dominant profile, one who embodies tradition and rule. This type of leadership exemplifies the power to construct order.

=== Rational-legal authority: rational grounds ===
- Acquired from law and is constructed from the reliance of society's rules and laws. This type of authority has the confidence to leave the right of leaders to undertake the decisions and set the policy. Rational-legal authority is the basis of modern democracies. Examples of this type of authority: officials elected by voters, rules that are in the constitution, or policies that are written in a formal document.
- Rational-legal authority is built on a structure of bureaucracy. In a rational-legal authority one ascends in their career paths through promotion and they eventually retire. Some of the benefits of rational-legal authority are transportation, large-scale industry, mass communication and an income economy. Other outcomes of rational-legal authority are tendencies towards equal opportunity and a promotion of education.
- Rational-legal authority requires a logical and systematic approach to leadership. Weber's rational leadership prevails in decision making.
- Finally, rational-legal authority derives its power from the system of bureaucracy and legality.

=== Charismatic authority: charismatic grounds ===
- Comes from individuals and their personal qualities. Certain individuals are influential to others with their unique qualities which help them gain followers. The span of a "charismatic" individual's power and authority can vary from a specific group to an entire society. Examples of charismatic leaders include: Joan of Arc, Adolf Hitler, Martin Luther King Jr, Jesus Christ.
- Charismatic authority has no clear structure; it is based on individual influence. One is chosen to be staff by their charismatic characteristics. Someone under a charismatic authority lives under gifts not salary. As long as someone has influence they will be a legitimate power.
- In charismatic authority, confidence is the driving force for leadership. With charismatic authority leadership has the ability to connect distinct groups and lead them to the finish line.

== Emergence of the modern state ==
Weber wrote that the modern state based on rational-legal authority emerged from the patrimonial and feudal struggle for power (see traditional authority) uniquely in the Occidental civilization. The prerequisites for the modern Western state are:

- Monopolization by central authority of the means of administration and control based on a centralized and stable system of taxation and use of physical force
- Monopolization of legislative
- Organization of an officialdom, dependent upon the central authority

Weber argued that some of those attributes have existed in various time or places, but together they existed only in Occidental civilization. The conditions that favoured this were

- Emergence of rational-legal rationality (various status groups in the Occident promoted that emergence)
- Emergence of modern officialdom (bureaucracy), which required
  - Development of the money economy, where officials are compensated in money instead of kind (usually land grants)
  - Quantitative and qualitative expansion of administrative tasks
  - Centralization and increased efficiency of administration.

Weber's belief that rational-legal authority did not exist in Imperial China has been heavily criticized, and does not have many supporters in the early 21st century.

== Modern state ==
According to Weber, a modern state exists where a political community has:

- An administrative and legal order that has been created and can be changed by legislation that also determines its role
- Binding authority over citizens and actions in its jurisdiction
- The right to legitimately use the physical force in its jurisdiction

An important attribute of Weber's definition of a modern state was that it is a bureaucracy. The vast majority of the modern states from the 20th century onward fall under the rational-legal authority category.

== Rational-legal leaders ==
The majority of modern bureaucratic officials and political leaders represent this type of authority.

Officials:

- Are personally free.
- Serve a higher authority.
- Are appointed on the basis of conduct and their technical qualifications.
- Are responsible for the impartial execution of assigned tasks.
- Their work is a full-time occupation.
- Their work is methodical and rational
- Their work is rewarded by a salary and prospects of career advancement.

Politicians:

- Are solely responsible for independent action.
- Must recognize that public actions that conflict with their basic policy must be rejected.
- Should have charismatic appeal to win elections under conditions of universal suffrage.

Weber provided ten necessities addressing: "how individual officials are appointed and work". The administrative staff are under the supreme authority for legal authority in a bureaucratic administrative style.

1. They are personally free and subject to authority only with respect to their impersonal official obligation.
2. They are organized in a clearly defined hierarchy of offices.
3. Each office has a clearly defined sphere of competence in the legal sense.
4. The office is filled by a free contractual relationship or free selection.
5. Candidates are selected on the basis of technical qualification.
6. They are remunerated by fixed salaries in money for the most part, with a right to pensions.
7. The office is treated as the sole, or at least primary, occupation of incumbent.
8. It constitutes a career. Promotions are dependent on the judgement of superiors.
9. The official works entirely separated from ownership of the means of administration and without appropriation of his/her position.
10. He is subject to strict and systematic discipline and control in the conduct of the office.

== See also ==
- Power (social and political)
