= Traditional authority =

Leadership with authority tied to tradition

Traditional authority is a form of leadership in which the authority of an organization or a regime is largely tied to tradition or custom. Reasons for the given state of affairs include belief that tradition is inherently valuable and a more general appeal to tradition.

== In sociology ==
In sociology, the concept of traditional authority (domination) comes from Max Weber's tripartite classification of authority, the other two forms being charismatic authority and rational-legal authority. All of those three domination types represent an example of his ideal type concept. Weber noted that in history those ideal types of domination are always found in combinations.

In traditional authority, the legitimacy of the authority comes from tradition; in charismatic authority from the personality and leadership qualities of the individual; and in rational-legal authority from people that are bureaucratically and legally attached to certain positions.

=== Patriarchs and their households ===
Weber derives the traditional domination from patriarchies and their households – in other words, from the ancient tradition of family (the authority of a master over his household). The master is designated in accordance with the rules of inheritance. He has no administrative staff nor any machinery to enforce his will by force alone; he depends on the willingness of the group members to respect his authority. Those members stand in personal relations to him. They obey him based on the belief that this is their duty sanctioned by immemorial tradition and on feeling of filial piety for the person of the master.

=== Patrimonialism ===
Patrimonial government occurs when the ruler's household expands with the household administration giving rise to governmental offices. All officials are personal dependents or favourites of the ruler, appointed by him. Their interactions with the ruler are based on paternal authority and filial dependence. The officials treat their work as a personal service to the ruler. The ruler has complete control over the officials; he empowers them from case to case, assigns specific tasks, promotes and demotes. They have no rights, rather they have privileges granted and withdrawn by the ruler. It is rare to discover any clear and stable hierarchy and responsibility in the deluge of official titles of most patrimonial administrations.

Military force is an important instrument of a patrimonial rule. Weber distinguished five types of military organisations. In all of those cases the military is a tool of the ruler, solely for his use—but he is responsible for its upkeep (equipment, maintenance and wages).

With the growth of the territory organized and more independent administrative staff and military force became a necessity. This usually leads to decentralisation, and some individuals gain more independence in the form of certain rights (for example, the right to inheritance and marriage without the consent of the rulers, to be judged by independent courts instead of officials of the royal household, etc.).

One of the best examples of almost pure type of patrimonialism is ancient Egypt, where the population was entirely dependent upon the control of the waterways (Nile River). This facilitated the creation of centralised government. When the royal household required it, the individual had to perform the public duties, such as participate in labor-intensive project (rising of the pyramids). Thus the whole country was in fact the patriarchal household of the pharaoh.

When land is given to military or officials for the performance of their duties, their independence increases and the power of the ruler weakens (consider the Mameluks and their rebellions, or the difference between Chinese Confucian literati who were never able to overthrow the power of the emperor and European knights who evolved into powerful aristocracy in many cases vastly limiting the power of the kings (especially in the Polish–Lithuanian Commonwealth)).

Patrimonial dominance has often prevailed in the Orient, where land remained in the control of the ruler. However, in the Occident the ruler lost control of the lands given to the nobility, which according to Weber was a major reason for patrimonialism being replaced by feudalism.

=== Feudalism ===
When compared to patrimonialism, feudalism has one major similarity and several important differences.

The similarity is that both are based on tradition and have powerful rulers who grant rights in return for military and administrative services.

The differences are important for the subtler distinction:

- feudalism replaces the paternal relationship of patrimonialism by a contract of allegiance based on knightly militarism.
- the patrimonial ruler's grants of authority and the personal dependence of official are replaced in feudalism by the contractual freedom, personal allegiance and socioeconomic prominence on the part of the vassals.

=== Traditional leaders ===
Most of the representatives of any dynasty ruling for more than one generation (kings, emperors, sultans, etc.) would fall into that category. Thus, the majority of monarchies and some autocracies and theocracies would be ruled by traditional leaders.

Often the male head of a common family should be considered a traditional leader. This could also be the case in a family-owned business if its director and other leadership positions are chosen based on family ties and/or age.

== See also ==
- Pre-industrial society
- The Three Types of Legitimate Rule
