= Charismatic authority =

Concept developed by Max Weber

In the field of sociology, charismatic authority is a concept of organizational leadership wherein the authority of the leader derives from the personal charisma of the leader. In the tripartite classification of authority, the sociologist Max Weber contrasts charismatic authority (character, heroism, leadership, religious) against two other types of authority: (i) rational-legal authority (modern law, the sovereign state, bureaucracy) and (ii) traditional authority (patriarchy, patrimonialism, feudalism).

The Ancient Greek word charisma became known through the Pauline epistles to Christian communities in the first century of the Common Era, wherein the word charisma denoted and described a gift of divine origin that demonstrated the divine authority possessed by the early leaders of the Church. Weber developed the theological term and the concept of charisma into a secular term for the sociological study of organizations. Terms derived from charisma include charismatic domination and charismatic leadership.

== Characteristics ==
=== Charisma ===
Weber applies the term charisma to

[A] certain quality of an individual personality, by virtue of which he is set apart from ordinary men and treated as endowed with supernatural, superhuman, or at least specifically exceptional powers or qualities. These are such as are not accessible to the ordinary person, but are regarded as of divine origin or as exemplary, and on the basis of them the individual concerned is treated as a leader. . . . How the quality in question would be ultimately judged from an ethical, aesthetic, or other such point of view is naturally indifferent for the purpose of definition. (Note: Original German: "»Charisma« soll eine als außeralltäglich (ursprünglich, sowohl bei Propheten wie bei therapeutischen wie bei Rechts-Weisen wie bei Jagdführern wie bei Kriegshelden: als magisch bedingt) geltende Qualität einer Persönlichkeit heißen, um derentwillen sie als mit übernatürlichen oder übermenschlichen oder mindestens spezifisch außeralltäglichen, nicht jedem andern zugänglichen Kräften oder Eigenschaften oder als gottgesandt oder als vorbildlich und deshalb als »Führer« gewertet wird.")

In the modern era, some psychologists have defined charisma in terms of practical outcomes (i.e. charismatic leaders are effective). However, such a definition is circular in reasoning. The conclusions derived from such definitions (and measures) cannot be refuted given that the proponents claim something akin to if effective, therefore charismatic. Charisma, however, can be studied scientifically if seen as a costly signal, using values, symbols, and emotions. It was shown to correlate strongly with general intelligence and observers infer that those signaling charisma are more competent. Its economic value in consequential settings has also been scientifically examined. Thus Weber's insights were valuable in naming the construct of charisma, although his definitions and insights did not allow for its scientific study. Modern social science however, has found supports for the notion that charismatic leaders can, under certain conditions, be very persuasive.

=== Authority ===
Weber interchanges authority and dominance

[H]as been considered in sociological terms as indicating the legitimate or socially approved use of power. It is the legitimate power which one person or a group holds and exercises over another. The element of legitimacy is vital to the notion of authority and is the main means by which authority is distinguished from the more general concept of power. Power can be exerted by the use of force or violence. Authority, by contrast, depends on the acceptance by subordinates of the right of those above them to give them orders or directives. Charismatic authority is often the most lasting of regimes because the leader is seen as infallible and any action against him will be seen as a crime against the state. Charismatic leaders eventually develop a cult of personality often not by their own doing.

[P]ower legitimized on the basis of a leader's exceptional personal qualities or the demonstration of extraordinary insight and accomplishment, which inspire loyalty and obedience from followers.

Leadership is the power to diffuse a positive energy and a sense of greatness. As such, it rests almost entirely on the leader. The absence of that leader for any reason can lead to the authority's power dissolving. However, due to its idiosyncratic nature and lack of formal organization, charismatic authority depends much more strongly on the perceived legitimacy of the authority than Weber's other forms of authority. For instance, a charismatic leader in a religious context might require an unchallenged belief that the leader has been touched by God, in the sense of a prophet. Should the strength of this belief fade, the power of the charismatic leader can fade quickly, which is one of the ways in which this form of authority shows itself to be unstable. Charismatic leaders not only inspire followers through vision and emotion, but also draw significantly more attention to their communications, since a study shows that followers spent longer reading both consistent and inconsistent messages when delivered by high-charisma leaders.

In contrast to the current popular use of the term charismatic leader, Weber saw charismatic authority not so much as character traits of the charismatic leader but as a relationship between the leader and his followers. The validity of charisma is founded on its "recognition" by the leader's followers (or "adepts" – Anhänger). His charisma risks disappearing if he is "abandoned by God" or if "his government doesn't provide any prosperity to those whom he dominates". (Note: A Weber-style charismatic leader need not be a positive force; both Benito Mussolini and Adolf Hitler qualify. Furthermore, sociology is axiologically neutral (Wertfreie Soziologie) towards various forms of charismatic domination: it does not differentiate between the charisma of a Berserker, of a shaman or of that displayed by Kurt Eisner. For Weber, sociology considers these types of charismatic domination in "an identical manner to the charisma of heroes, prophets, the "greatest saviours according to common appreciation".)

=== Routinizing charisma ===
Charismatic authority almost always endangers the boundaries set by traditional (coercive) or rational (legal) authority. It tends to challenge this authority, and is thus often seen as revolutionary. Usually this charismatic authority is incorporated into society. Hereby the challenge that it presents to society will subside. The way in which this happens is called routinization.

By routinization, the charismatic authority changes:

[C]harismatic authority is succeeded by a bureaucracy controlled by a rationally established authority or by a combination of traditional and bureaucratic authority.

In politics, charismatic rule is often found in various authoritarian states, autocracies, dictatorships and theocracies. To help to maintain their charismatic authority, such regimes will often establish a vast personality cult. When the leader of such a state dies or leaves office, and a new charismatic leader does not appear, such a regime is likely to fall shortly thereafter, unless it has become fully routinized.

== Charismatic succession ==
Because the authority is concentrated in one leader, the death of the charismatic leader would constitute the destruction of the government unless prior arrangements were made. A society that faces the end of their charismatic leader can choose to move to another format of leadership or to have a transference of charismatic authority to another leader by means of succession.

According to Max Weber, the methods of succession are: search, revelation, designation by original leader, designation by qualified staff, hereditary charisma, and office charisma. These are the various ways in which an individual and a society can contrive to maintain the unique energy and nature of charisma in their leadership.

=== Search ===
"The search for a new charismatic leader (takes place) on the basis of the qualities which will fit him for the position of authority." An example of this search method is the search for a new Dalai Lama. "It consists in a search for a child with characteristics which are interpreted to mean that he is a reincarnation of the Buddha." This search is an example of the way in which an original charismatic leader can be forced to "live on" through a replacement.

=== Revelation ===
"In this case the legitimacy of the new leader is dependent on the legitimacy of the technique of selection." The technique of selection is the modus operandi of the selection process. In ancient times, oracles were believed to have special access to "divine judgment" and thus their technique in selection was perceived to be legitimate. Their choice was imbued with the charismatic authority that came with the oracle's endorsement.

=== Designation by original leader ===
In this form, the original holder of charismatic authority is perceived to have passed their authority to another. An example is Joseph Stalin's claim that Vladimir Lenin had designated him to be his successor as leader of the USSR. Insofar as people believed in this claim, Stalin gained Lenin's charismatic authority.

=== Designated by qualified staff ===
"A successor (may be designated) by the charismatically qualified administrative staff... (T)his process should not be interpreted as 'election' or 'nomination'... It is not determined by merely a majority vote...Unanimity (is) often required." A case example of this form of succession is the papal conclave of cardinals to choose a new pope. The cardinals taking part in the papal conclave are viewed to be charismatically qualified by their Roman Catholic congregations and thus their choice is imbued with charismatic authority.

=== Hereditary charisma ===
Charisma can be perceived as "a quality transmitted by heredity". This method of succession is present in Kim Il Sung's charisma being passed on to his son, Kim Jong Il. This type of succession is a difficult undertaking and often results in a movement toward traditionalization and legalization in authority.

=== Office charisma ===
"The concept of charisma may be transmitted by ritual means from one bearer to another...It involves a dissociation of charisma from a particular individual, making it an objective, transferable entity." Priestly consecration is believed to be a modus through which priestly charisma to teach and perform other priestly duties is transferred to a person. In this way, priests inherit priestly charisma and are subsequently perceived by their congregations as having the charismatic authority that comes with the priesthood.

== Application of Weber's theories ==
Weber's model of charismatic leadership giving way to institutionalization is endorsed by several academic sociologists.

=== New religious movements ===
Eileen Barker discusses the tendency for new religious movements to have founders or leaders who wield considerable charismatic authority and are believed to have special powers or knowledge. Charismatic leaders are unpredictable, Barker says, for they are not bound by tradition or rules and they may be accorded by their followers the right to pronounce on all aspects of their lives. Barker warns that in these cases the leader may lack any accountability, require unquestioning obedience, and encourage a dependency upon the movement for material, spiritual and social resources.

George D. Chryssides asserts that not all new religious movements have charismatic leaders, and that there are differences in the hegemonic styles among those movements that do.

== Narcissism ==
Len Oakes, an Australian psychologist who wrote a dissertation about charisma, had eleven charismatic leaders fill in a psychometric test, which he called the adjective checklist, and found them as a group quite ordinary. Following the psychoanalyst Heinz Kohut, Oakes argues that charismatic leaders exhibit traits of narcissism and also argues that they display an extraordinary amount of energy, accompanied by an inner clarity unhindered by the anxieties and guilt that afflict more ordinary people. He did, however, not fully follow Weber's framework of charismatic authority.

== Comparison table ==
	Charismatic	Traditional	Legal-Rational
Type of ruler	Charismatic leader	Dominant personality	Functional superiors or bureaucratic officials
Position determined by	Having a dynamic personality	Established tradition or routine	Legally established authority
Ruled using	Extraordinary qualities and exceptional powers	Acquired or inherited (hereditary) qualities	Virtue of rationally established norms, decrees, and other rules and regulations
Legitimized by	Victories and success to community	Established tradition or routine	General belief in the formal correctness of these rules and those who enact them are considered a legitimized authority
Loyalty	Interpersonal & personal allegiance and devotion	Based on traditional allegiances	To authority/rules
Cohesion	Emotionally unstable and volatile	Feeling of common purpose	Abiding by rules (see Merton's theory of deviance)
Leadership	Rulers and followers (disciples)	Established forms of social conduct	Rules, not rulers

== See also ==
- Authentic leadership
- Caudillo
- Demagogue
- Führerprinzip
- Great man theory
- Monarch
- Power (social and political)
- Tripartite classification of authority
- The Three Types of Legitimate Rule
