= Tripartite classification of authority =

Weber's classification of authority into three parts

The German sociologist Max Weber (1864–1920) distinguished three ideal types of legitimate political leadership/domination/authority (German: Herrschaft, lit. 'mastership'). He wrote about these three types of domination both in his essay "The Three Types of Legitimate Rule", which was published in his 1921 masterwork Economy and Society (see Weber 1922/1978:215-216), and in his classic 1919 speech "Politics as a Vocation" (see Weber 1919/2015:137-138):

1. charismatic authority (character, heroism, leadership, religious),
2. traditional authority (patriarchs, patrimonialism, feudalism) and
3. rational-legal authority (modern law and state, bureaucracy).

These three types are ideal types and rarely appear in their pure form.

According to Weber, authority (as distinct from power (German: Macht)) is power accepted as legitimate by those subjected to it. The three forms of authority are said to appear in a "hierarchical development order". States progress from charismatic authority, to traditional authority, and finally reach the state of rational-legal authority which is characteristic of a modern liberal democracy.

== Charismatic authority ==
Charismatic authority grows out of the personal charm or the strength of an individual personality. It was described by Weber in a lecture as "the authority of the extraordinary and personal gift of grace (charisma)"; he distinguished it from the other forms of authority by stating "Men do not obey him [the charismatic ruler] by virtue of tradition or statute, but because they believe in him." Thus the actual power or capabilities of the leader are irrelevant, as long as the followers believe that such power exists. Thus, according to Weber, it is particularly difficult for charismatic leaders to maintain their authority because the followers must continue to legitimize the authority of the leader. Officials consist of those who have shown personal devotion to the ruler, and of those who possess their own charisma.

Charismatic authority is different from legal-rational and traditional power insofar as it does not develop from established tradition but rather from the belief the followers have in the leader.

According to Weber, once the leader loses his charisma or dies, systems based on charismatic authority tend to transform into traditional or legal-rational systems.

== Traditional authority ==
In systems based around traditional authority, legitimacy comes from tradition or custom, even the nominal personal ruler(s) being subject to it; Weber described it as "the authority of the eternal yesterday" and identified it as the source of authority for monarchies. In this type of domination, the traditional rights of a powerful individual or group are accepted by the subordinate, or at least not challenged. The dominant individual could be a clan leader, eldest, the head of a family, a patriarchal figure or dominant elite. Officials consist either of personal retainers (in a patrimonial regime) or of personal loyal allies, such as vassals or tributary lords (in a feudal regime). Their prerogatives are usually similar to those of the ruler above them, just reduced in scale, and they too are often selected based on inheritance. Historically this has been the most common type of government.

According to Weber, inequalities are created and preserved by traditional authority. Should this authority not be challenged, the dominant leader or group will stay in power. For Weber, traditional power blocked the development of rational-legal authority.

== Rational-legal authority ==
Legal authority, also known as rational-legal authority, is based on a system of rules that is applied administratively and judicially in accordance with known principles. The persons who administer those rules are appointed or elected by legal procedures. Superiors are also subject to rules that limit their powers, separate their private lives from official duties and require written documentation. It is the authority that demands obedience to the office rather than the officeholder; once a leader leaves office, their rational-legal authority is lost. Weber identified "rationally-created rules" as the central feature of this form of authority. Modern democracies contain many examples of legal-rational regimes. There are different ways in which legal authority can develop. Many societies have developed a system of laws and regulations and there exist many different principles of legality. With the development of a legal-rational system, the political system is likely to be rationalized similarly. Constitutions, written documents, established offices and regular elections are often associated with modern legal-rational political systems. These in the past have tended to develop in opposition to earlier traditional systems such as monarchies, where the set of rules are not well developed. As these systems develop in a rational manner, authority takes on a legal-rational form. Those who govern have the legitimate legal right to do so and those subordinated accept the legality of the rulers.

Albeit rational-legal authority may be challenged by those subordinated, it is unlikely to result in a quick change in the nature of the system. Such power struggles, according to Weber, are mostly political struggles and may be based on nationalism or ethnicity.

== The classification of authority in the context of history ==
Weber also notes that legal domination is the most advanced, and that societies evolve from having mostly traditional and charismatic authorities to mostly rational and legal ones, because the instability of charismatic authority inevitably forces it to "routinize" into a more structured form of authority. Likewise he notes that in a pure type of traditional rule, sufficient resistance to a master can lead to a "traditional revolution". Thus he alludes to an inevitable move towards a rational-legal structure of authority, utilizing a bureaucratic structure. This ties to his broader concept of rationalization by suggesting the inevitability of a move in this direction. Thus this theory can be sometimes viewed as part of the social evolutionism theory.

In traditional authority, the legitimacy of the authority comes from tradition, in charismatic authority from the personality and leadership qualities of the individual (charisma), and in legal (or rational-legal) authority from powers that are bureaucratically and legally attached to certain positions. A classic example of these three types may be found in religion: priests (traditional), Jesus (charismatic), and the Catholic Church (legal-rational). Weber also conceived of these three types within his three primary modes of conflict: traditional authority within status groups, charismatic authority within class, and legal-rational authority within party organizations.

In his view every historical relation between rulers and ruled contained elements that can be analyzed on the basis of the above distinction.

== Comparison table ==
	Charismatic	Traditional	Legal-Rational
Type of ruler	Charismatic leader	Dominant personality	Functional superiors or bureaucratic officials
Position determined by	Having a dynamic personality	Established tradition or routine	Legally established authority
Ruled using	Extraordinary qualities and exceptional powers	Acquired or inherited (hereditary) qualities	Virtue of rationally established norms, decrees, and other rules and regulations
Legitimized	Victories and success to community	Established tradition or routine	General belief in the formal correctness of these rules and those who enact them are considered a legitimized authority
Loyalty	Interpersonal & personal allegiance and devotion	Based on traditional allegiances	To authority / rules
Cohesion	Emotionally unstable and volatile	Feeling of common purpose	Abiding by rules (see Merton's theory of deviance)
Leadership	Rulers and followers (disciples)	Established forms of social conduct	Rules, not rulers

== See also ==
- Authority (sociology)
- Forms of government

== Bibliography ==
- Weber, Max (1978/1922). Economy and Society, edited by Guenther Roth and Claus Wittich. Berkeley: University of California Press.
- Weber, Max (2015/1919). "Politics as Vocation" in Weber's Rationalism and Modern Society. Edited and Translated by Tony Waters and Dagmar Waters, New York: Palgrave Macmillan, 2015, pp. 129–198.
