= Ideal type =

Typological term

Ideal type (German: Idealtypus), also known as pure type, is a typological term most closely associated with the sociologist Max Weber (1864–1920). For Weber, the conduct of social science depends upon the construction of abstract, hypothetical concepts. The "ideal type" is therefore a subjective element in social theory and research, and one of the subjective elements distinguishing sociology from natural science.

== Meaning ==
An ideal type is formed from characteristics and elements of the given phenomena, but it is not meant to correspond to all of the characteristics of any one particular case. It is not meant to refer to perfect things, moral ideals nor to statistical averages but rather to stress certain elements common to most cases of the given phenomenon. In using the word "ideal," Max Weber refers to the world of ideas (German: Gedankenbilder, "mental images") and not to perfection; these "ideal types" are idea-constructs that help put the seeming chaos of social reality in order.

Weber wrote: "An ideal type is formed by the one-sided accentuation of one or more points of view and by the synthesis of a great many diffuse, discrete, more or less present and occasionally absent concrete individual phenomena, which are arranged according to those onesidedly emphasized viewpoints into a unified analytical construct..." Therefore, ideal types are a form of perfect representation. It is a useful tool for comparative sociology in analyzing social or economic phenomena, having advantages over a very general, abstract idea and a specific historical example. It can be used to analyze both a general, suprahistorical phenomenon such as capitalism or historically unique occurrences such as in Weber's Protestant Ethics analysis.

To try to understand a particular phenomenon, one must not only describe the actions of its participants but "interpret" them by classifying behavior as belonging to some prior "ideal type." Weber described four "ideal types" of behavior: zweckrational (goal-rationality), wertrational (value-rationality), affektual (emotional-rationality), and traditional (custom, unconscious habit).

Weber states that an "ideal type" never seeks to claim its validity in terms of a reproduction of or correspondence with social reality. Its validity can be ascertained only in terms of adequacy, which is too conveniently ignored by the proponents of positivism. This does not mean, however, that objectivity, limited as it is, can be gained by "weighing the various evaluations against one another and making a 'statesman-like' compromise among them", which is often proposed as a solution by those propounding methodological perspectivism. Such a practice, which Weber calls "syncretism", is not only impossible but also unethical, for it avoids "the practical duty to stand up for our own ideals" [Weber 1904/1949, p. 58].

== Scholarly reception ==
It is commonly argued that idealization plays a key role in the methodology of other social sciences, especially of economics.

For example, homo economicus is the result of a consistent abstraction-idealization process. One of the fundamental axioms of neoclassical economics, the law of diminishing marginal utility, followed from the highlighting of Weber-Fechner's law in psychophysics, which highlights that the growth of subjectively perceived intensity of recurrent stimuli with the same physical intensity is always decreasing. The same law emerges in the law of diminishing marginal returns. Homo economicus as presupposed by Neoclassicals is an idealized, abstract creature that can be characterized by an intention to exchange and whose only task is to take economic decisions. For homo economicus, there is no time or social and natural environment, he is ageless, he has no whims, and his decisions are not biased by occasional effects from the (social) environment. So, his behaviour only reflects the objective and consistently prevailing economic laws established by formal rationality. After all, human (and social) sciences, similarly to natural sciences, i.e. abstracting from everything subjective, constrained themselves to phrase only objective truths.

However, the conceptualizing routine of neoclassical economics differs from the genuine approach of Max Weber in that Neoclassicals focused exactly on finding and deducing economic laws (in accordance with the efforts of natural sciences), while the ideal-types of the Weberian sociology only supported the interpretative understanding of past events with no references to causal laws. Even if the method and the strategy of creating ideal-typical concepts are common, these are two opposing scientific programs eventually. Weber offers an excellent description and a user's guide to the technique of abstraction and idealization that also directly applies to the conceptualizing strategy of mainstream economics that is on a completely different track with its law-seeking efforts.

== Criticism ==
Critics of ideal type include proponents of the normal type theory. Some sociologists argue that ideal type tends to focus on extreme phenomena and overlook the connections between them, and that it is difficult to show how the types and their elements fit into a theory of a total social system.

== See also ==
- Antipositivism – Theoretical stance in social science
- Morphological analysis (problem-solving) – Exploration of possible solutions
- Reification (fallacy) – Fallacy of treating an abstraction as if it were a real thing
- Social action – Act which takes other individuals into account
- Structure and agency – Debate in social sciences
- Tripartite classification of authority – Weber's classification of authority into three parts
- Verstehen – Social science conception of understanding and relation
