= Political system =

System of politics and government

In political science, a political system means the form of political organization that can be observed, recognised or otherwise declared by a society or state.

It defines the process for making official government decisions. It usually comprizes the governmental legal and economic system, social and cultural system, and other state and government specific systems. However, this is a very simplified view of a much more complex system of categories involving the questions of who should have authority and what the government influence on its people and economy should be.

Along with a basic sociological and socio-anthropological classification, political systems can be classified on a social-cultural axis relative to the liberal values prevalent in the Western world, where the spectrum is represented as a continuum between political systems recognized as democracies, totalitarian regimes and, sitting between these two, authoritarian regimes, with a variety of hybrid regimes; and monarchies may be also included as a standalone entity or as a hybrid system of the main three.

== Definition ==
According to David Easton, "A political system can be designated as the interactions through which values are authoritatively allocated for a society". Political system refers broadly to the process by which laws are made and public resources allocated in society, and to the relationships among those involved in making these decisions.

== Basic classification ==
Social anthropologists generally recognize several kinds of political systems, often differentiating between ones that they consider uncentralized and ones they consider centralized.

- Uncentralized systems
  - Band society
    - Small family group, no larger than an extended family or clan; it has been defined as consisting of no more than 30 to 50 individuals.
    - A band can cease to exist if only a small group walks out.
  - Tribe
    - Generally larger, consisting of many families. Tribes have more social institutions, such as a chief or elders.
    - More permanent than bands. Many tribes are subdivided into bands.
- Centralized governments
  - Chiefdom
    - More complex than a tribe or a band society, and less complex than a state or a civilization
    - Characterized by pervasive inequality and centralization of authority.
    - A single lineage/family of the elite class becomes the ruling elite of the chiefdom
    - Complex chiefdoms have two or even three tiers of political hierarchy.
    - "An autonomous political unit comprising a number of villages or communities under the permanent control of a paramount chief"
  - Sovereign state
    - A sovereign state is a state with a permanent population, a defined territory, a government and the capacity to enter into relations with other sovereign states.
- Supranational political systems
  - Supranational political systems are created by independent nations to reach a common goal or gain strength from forming an alliance.
- Empires
  - Empires are widespread states consisting of people of different ethnicities under a single rule. Empires - such as the Romans, or British - often made considerable progress in ways of political structures, creating and building city infrastructures, and maintaining civility within the diverse communities. Because of the intricate organization of the empires, they were often able to hold a large majority of power on a universal level.
- Leagues
  - Leagues are international organizations composed of states coming together for a single common purpose. In this way, leagues are different from empires, as they only seek to fulfil a single goal. Often leagues are formed on the brink of a military or economic downfall. Meetings and hearings are conducted in a neutral location with representatives of all involved nations present.

== Social political science ==
The sociological interest in political systems is figuring out who holds power within the relationship between the government and its people and how the government's power is used. According to Yale professor Juan José Linz, there are three main types of political systems today: democracies, totalitarian regimes and, sitting between these two, authoritarian regimes (with hybrid regimes). Another modern classification system includes monarchies as a standalone entity or as a hybrid system of the main three. Scholars generally refer to a dictatorship as either a form of authoritarianism or totalitarianism.

=== Democracy ===
Democracy (Note: from Ancient Greek: δημοκρατία, romanized: dēmokratía, from dēmos 'people' and krátos 'rule') is a form of government in which political power is vested in the people or the population of a certain state. Under a minimalist definition of democracy, rulers are elected through competitive elections while more expansive or maximalist definitions link democracy to guarantees of civil liberties and human rights in addition to competitive elections.

=== Authoritarianism ===
Authoritarianism is a political system characterized by the rejection of political plurality, the use of strong central power to preserve the political status quo, and reductions in democracy, separation of powers, civil liberties, and the rule of law. Authoritarian regimes may be either autocratic or oligarchic and may be based upon the rule of a party, the military, or the concentration of power in a single person. States that have a blurred boundary between democracy and authoritarianism have sometimes been characterized as "hybrid democracies", "hybrid regimes" or "competitive authoritarian" states.

=== Totalitarian ===
Totalitarianism is a political system and a form of government that completely controls the public sphere and the private sphere of society. It is characterized by its prohibition of opposing political parties and its extreme suppression of opposition to the state. In the field of political science, totalitarianism is the extreme form of authoritarianism, wherein all political power is held by a dictator. This figure controls the national politics and peoples of the nation with continual propaganda campaigns that are broadcast by state-controlled and state-aligned private mass communications media.

=== Monarchy ===
A monarchy is a hereditary arrangement in which the position of head of state, which may or may not be associated with political power, is legally passed on to a family member of the monarch, a head of state who reigns for life. While most monarchs gain their position based on various hereditary succession laws, they can occasionally gain their authority via election.

Monarchies have historically been a common form of government. Nearly half of all independent states at the start of the 19th century were monarchies. After reaching a peak in the middle of the 19th century, the proportion of monarchies in the world has steadily declined. Republics replaced many monarchies, notably at the end of World War I and World War II.

=== Hybrid ===
A hybrid regime (Note: Scholars use a variety of terms to encompass the "grey zones" between full autocracies and full democracies. Such terms include: competitive authoritarianism, semi-authoritarianism, hybrid authoritarianism, electoral authoritarianism, liberal autocracy, delegative democracy, illiberal democracy, guided democracy, semi-democracy, deficient democracy, defective democracy, and hybrid democracy.) is a type of political system often created as a result of an incomplete democratic transition from an authoritarian regime to a democratic one (or vice versa). (Note: Debates over what can be called "hybrid" still exist, see Hybrid regime § Definition.) Hybrid regimes are categorized as having a combination of autocratic features with democratic ones and can simultaneously hold political repressions and regular elections.

According to some definitions and measures, hybrid regimes are commonly found in developing countries with abundant natural resources such as petro-states.

== See also ==
- Anocracy
- Cartel party theory
- Political structure
- Polity
- Systems theory in political science
- Tractatus Politicus
- Voting system
