= Delegative democracy =

Type of government model

In political science, delegative democracy is a mode of governance close to Caesarism, Bonapartism, caudillismo or populism with a strong leader in a newly created otherwise democratic government. The concept arose from Argentinian political scientist Guillermo O'Donnell, who notes that representative democracy as it exists is usually linked solely to highly developed capitalist countries. However, newly installed democracies do not seem to be on a path of becoming fully representative democracies, and instead exhibit authoritarian tendencies. O'Donnell calls the former delegative democracies, for they are not fully consolidated democracies but may be enduring.

For a representative democracy to exist, there must be an important interaction effect. The successful cases have featured a decisive coalition of broadly supported political leaders who take great care in creating and strengthening democratic political institutions. By contrast, the delegative form is partially democratic, for the president has a free rein to act and justify his or her acts in the name of the people. The president can "govern as he sees fit" even if it does not resemble promises made while running for election. The president claims to represent the whole nation rather than just a political party, embodying even the legislature and the judiciary.

O'Donnell's notion of delegative democracy has been criticized as being misleading, because he renders the delegative model that is core to many current democratic governments worldwide into a negative concept.

== Comparing and understanding delegative democracy ==
Delegative Democracy has found its way to some of the largest countries in the world and some of these being post-communist. These countries include Argentina, Brazil, Peru, Ecuador, Bolivia, the Philippines, and Korea. When looking at these countries and others, it is evident that delegative democracies are not institutionalized as they are the midpoint between authoritarianism and representative democracy.

When looking at authoritarianism, authoritarianism is a type of government that focuses on strong centralized powers, leaving the population to having limited political freedoms. Authoritarianism is seen as having four main qualities of limited political pluralism, political legitimacy based on lawmakers and politicians appealing to emotion, minimal mobilization within the political sphere and the suppression of anti-regime activities, and finally loosely defined executive powers that can lead to dictatorships at times.

Representative democracy, on the other hand, is a type of government that is founded on democracy, based on elected officials that represent the governing body. Within a representative democracy, the power for the representatives is backed by a constitution or other factors to balance the representative power, such as independent judiciaries, deliberative democracy, and a bicameral legislature.

Delegative democracies are also described as defective democracies. The characteristics of a delegative democracy are that it undermines the idea of separation of powers (checks and balances). This is due to the fact that in the delegative democracy, the Executive branch holds dominant power, as the legislative and judicial branches of government (mainly the legislative) do not hold the ability to "check and balance" the Executive branch.

== Delegative democracy due to cycles ==
Delegative democracies are able to prosper in their respective areas due to the fact that there is a specific social and economic crisis that allows those in charge to go about the exercise of their authority. When looking at the history of delegative democracies, it is seen that they are typically set into place after an authoritarian ruling.

The timing after this ruling and establishment of a democratic-based government is known as the "second transition". This is moving from a democratically elected government to a democratic regime, also known as an institutionalized democracy. During this "second transition", new democracies can become autocracies again. The main element for determining what occurs during the second transition is the governmental policies and the political strategy. When the people see the success of these institutions that specifically support social and economic problems, delegative democracy prevails. This is what occurs in Spain.

The overall idea of delegative democracy as a whole is spun from Robert Dahl's definition of polyarchy. When an individual is elected within a delegative democracy, they are able to govern the country as they see fit. Some of these individuals include Indira Gandhi, Corazon Aquino, and Isabel Perón. The president is representative of the nation and their actions are said to represent the needs of the whole nation. Their actions are not party-affiliated and in fact, puts themselves above all parties. Unlike democratic republics like the United States who has Congress and the judiciary, accountability is put all on the president instead of other institutions. Although delegative democracy focuses power on one leader, it shares democratic traditions in terms of allowing the majority to win.

== Problems ==
Although some delegative democracies have been successful, there have been failures due to them falling into a pervasive cycle of unhappiness felt by those that are being governed. Although the large social and economic problems are what allows these presidents to set the platform of their party, it is also what allows them to receive a free pass from the electorate. Delegative democracy is all about the second phase of the democratic cycle. When this cycle is hindered by a lack of economic and social growth, conditions therefore tend to be unfavorable for the political leader.

According to Guillermo O’Donnell, "voters are supposed to choose, irrespective of their identities and affiliations, the individual who is most fit to take responsibility of the country… after the election, voters or delegators are expected to become passive, but cheering audience of what the president does". In this sense, voters and the population have their main say in government while they are voting, but once the president is elected, the system reduces their power in terms of freedom of expression.

== Case studies ==
=== Colombia ===
During his period of reign from 2002 to 2010, Colombia president Alvaro Uribe focused all of his power in the executive branch to shift his country towards a delegative democracy. As seen in the examples above, there are times when a delegative democracy can lead to the weakening of institutions, proving to be an endless cycle of political turmoil. Colombia represents an interesting case of overall changes after a delegative democracy is institutionalized through leaders such as Juan Manuel.

When looking at Colombia from 2002 to 2010, they were exhibiting a lack of checks and balances due to horizontal accountability where the governmental agencies serve the checks and balances. Various government agencies were not progressive towards people's needs. During Uribe's presidency, his first project was staging a national referendum that focused on establishing a unicameral congress. On top of that, Uribe and his inner group attempted to minimize those that were against this ruling. Credible members of political organizations were removed due to the questioning of his administration. These attacks on key institutions within Colombia represented a large issue in Uribe's governing style in the undermining of the institutionalization of democracy.

Uribe and his policies became known as "uribismo". "Uribismo" is what deteriorated the country's capacity for accountability between governmental offices. Uribismo ideas were mainly backed by the "U" Party and the Radical Change Party. Evident in all of these issues that Uribismo caused, delegative democracy leaders have a lack of qualifications but due to the viewpoints of the people, it justifies their authoritarian behavior.

=== Argentina ===
Christopher Larkins argues that due to the impact of the 1980's crisis, delegative democracy (in the sense of O'Donnell) originated in Argentina. The economic crisis was used to justify a centralization of executive authority which began with Raúl Alfonsín's administration and continued with Carlos Saul Menem ascending to the presidency. Larkin's arguments exemplify political outtakes on delegative democracy.

One of the largest examples of a Delegative democracy in Argentina. Argentina has seen large success in its delegative democracy due to the vertical accountability that is in place. Vertical accountability is when civilians can enforce the performance of those that are in charge. Horizontal accountability, on the other hand, is when only the government is able to hold itself accountable, leading to check abuses by public agencies. When looking at what transpired in Argentina specifically, the death of Alberto Nisman under the rule of President Fernández led to the foundation of delegative democracy.

Fernández was able to dissolve the Secretariat of Intelligence and replace it with her new Federal Intelligence Agency. This ruling became a foundation for delegative democracy. Fernandez also released the Central Bank Chief, Martin Redrado, after he failed to comply with the orders that she instilled.

=== Institutional Revolutionary Party ===
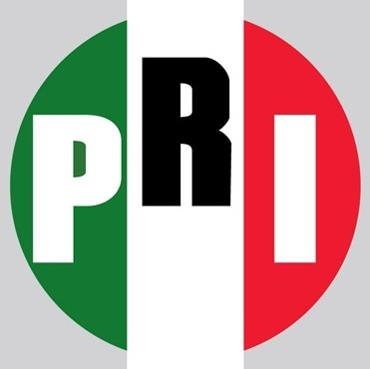
Institutional Revolutionary Party (PRI) logo

The Institutional Revolutionary Party (Spanish: Partido Revolucionario Institucional, PRI) in Mexico is an example of a party that led to a rise of delegative democracy within a country. The PRI came into power in 1929 with the help of Plutarco Elías Calles, a Mexican general and politician. Prior to the rise of the PRI, the country was plagued with political conflict and turmoil due to the assassination of President-elect Álvaro Obregón in 1928. One of the renowned symbols of the PRI is the dedazo (termed from the word dedo - finger). This symbolized the idea that the current president would pass down the title to whoever they "pointed the finger" to. This process alone shows why delegative democracy takes away the ideas of separation of powers as the democratic process in the people electing their officials is removed. In addition, instead of being checked and balanced by other branches, the president had a select group of cabinet advisers that consisted of at least three individuals extremely close to the president.

In 1988, the PRI slowly began to dissolve after multiple progression and the breaking out of the parties "Democratic Current" with Cuauhtémoc Cárdenas (former Governor of Michoacán and son of the former president of Mexico Lázaro Cárdenas).

=== Russian Federation ===
Russia's electoral law stipulates that half of all parliamentarians must come from voting on party lists, which aims to encourage the formation of political parties. In order to look for political partners and confront skeptical voters, parties must focus on introducing legislation, public opinion campaigns and political education. The parliamentarians, while democratically elected, use their democratic legitimacy to justify authoritarian behavior.

== See also ==
- Managed democracy
- Delegate model of representation
- Anocracy
