= Government =

System or group governing an organized community

World's states colored by systems of government: Parliamentary systems: Head of government is elected or nominated by and accountable to the legislature. Constitutional monarchy with a ceremonial monarch Semi-constitutional monarchy: Monarch holds significant executive or legislative power but is still restricted by the constitution. Parliamentary republic with a ceremonial president Parliamentary republic with an executive president Presidential system: Head of government (president) is popularly elected and independent of the legislature. Presidential republic Theocratic presidential republic: Supreme leader is highest authority; popularly elected president still exists. Hybrid systems: Semi-presidential republic: Executive president is independent of the legislature; head of government is appointed by the president and is accountable to the legislature. Assembly-independent republic: Head of government (president or directory) is elected by the legislature, but is not accountable to it. Other systems: Islamic theocracy: Supreme leader holds unlimited political and religious power; state and faith are a single institution. Absolute monarchy: Monarch has unlimited power. One-party state: Power is constitutionally linked to a single political party. Provisional government: Current regime is temporary or transitional; no permanent constitution. Military junta: Committee of military leaders controls the government; constitutional provisions are suspended. Places without governments. Note: this chart represents the de jure systems of government, not the de facto degree of democracy.

A government is the system or group of people which lead a state. As such, it is responsible for directing the only entity whose use of force is socially acceptable. Governments have come in many forms, whether dominated by one person (autocracy), a small ruling class (oligarchy), or the masses (democracy).

The main types of modern political systems recognized are democracies, totalitarian regimes, and authoritarian regimes, with a variety of hybrid regimes and some exceptions, such as monarchies which preserve pre-modern forms of traditional legitimacy.

== Definitions and etymology ==
A government is the system to govern a state or community. The Cambridge Dictionary defines government as, "the system used for controlling a country, city, or group of people", or "an organization that officially manages and controls a country or region, creating laws, collecting taxes, providing public services". It is the major or dominant organizing power in modern societies. While all types of organizations have governance, the word government is often used more specifically to refer to the approximately 200 independent national governments on Earth, as well as their subsidiary organizations, such as state and provincial governments as well as local governments.

The word government derives from the Greek verb κυβερνάω [kubernáo] meaning to steer with a gubernaculum (rudder), the metaphorical sense being attested in the literature of classical antiquity, including Plato's Ship of State. In British English, "government" sometimes refers to what is also known as a "ministry" or an "administration", i.e., the policies and government officials of a particular executive or governing coalition. Finally, government is also sometimes used in English as a synonym for rule or governance.

== History ==
=== Earliest governments ===
The moment and place that the phenomenon of human government developed is lost in time; however, history does record the formations of early governments. About 5,000 years ago, the first small city-states appeared. By the third to second millenniums BC, some of these had developed into larger governed areas: Sumer, ancient Egypt, the Indus Valley civilization, and the Yellow River civilization.

One reason that explains the emergence of governments includes agriculture. Since the Neolithic Revolution, agriculture has been an efficient method to create food surplus. This enabled people to specialize in non-agricultural activities. Some of them included being able to rule over others as an external authority. Others included social experimentation with diverse governance models. Both these activities formed the basis of governments. These governments gradually became more complex as agriculture supported larger and denser populations, creating new interactions and social pressures that the government needed to control. David Christian explains

As farming populations gathered in larger and denser communities, interactions between different groups increased and the social pressure rose until, in a striking parallel with star formation, new structures suddenly appeared, together with a new level of complexity. Like stars, cities and states reorganize and energize the smaller objects within their gravitational field.

Another explanation includes the need to properly manage infrastructure projects such as water infrastructure. Historically, this required centralized administration and complex social organisation, as seen in regions like Mesopotamia. However, there is archaeological evidence that shows similar successes with more egalitarian and decentralized complex societies.

=== Modern governments ===
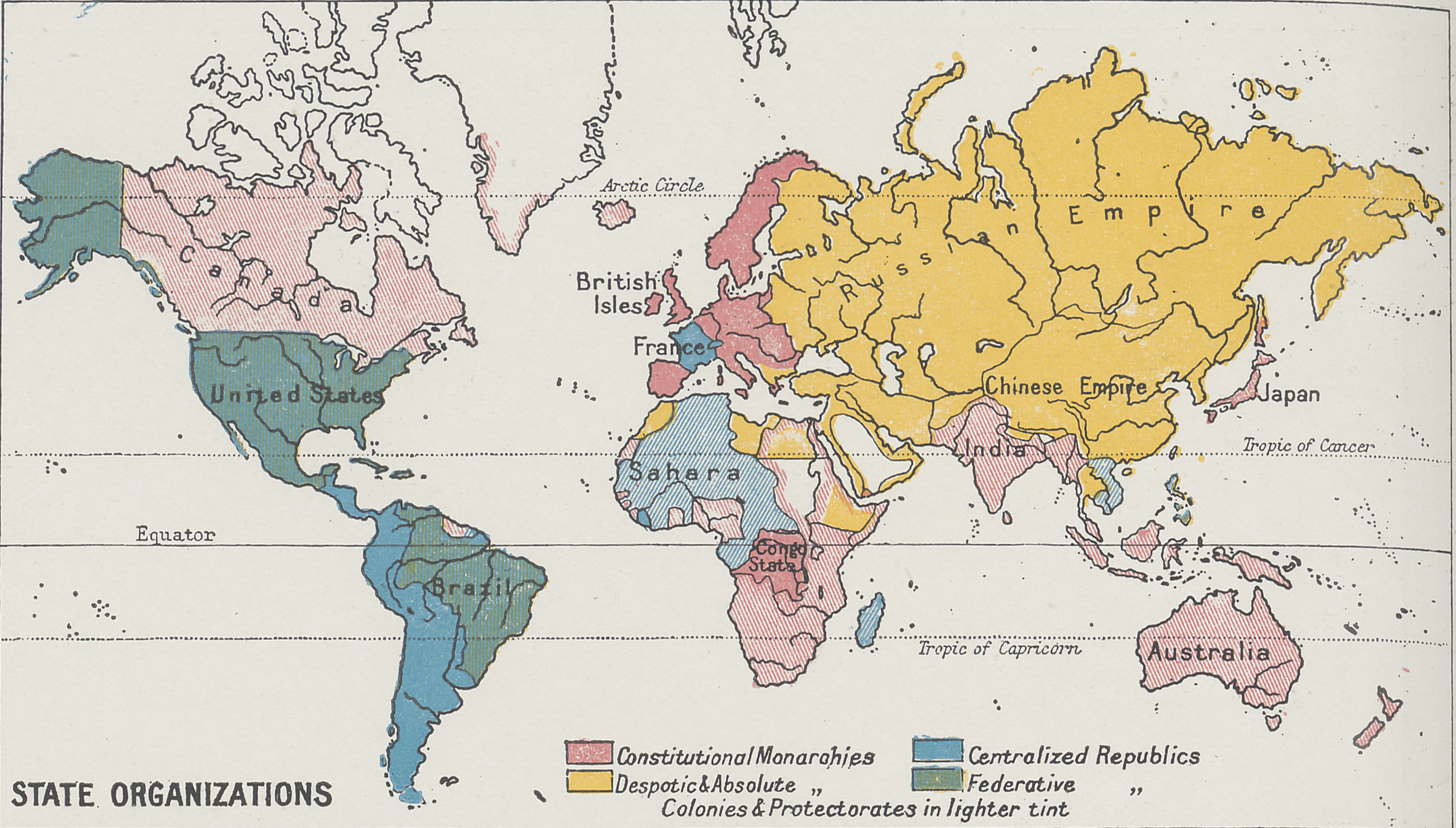
Forms of government in 1908 from The Harmsworth atlas and Gazetter

Starting at the end of the 17th century, the prevalence of republican forms of government grew. The English Civil War and Glorious Revolution in England, the American Revolution, and the French Revolution contributed to the growth of representative forms of government. The Soviet Union was the first large country to have a Communist government. Since the fall of the Berlin Wall, liberal democracy has become an even more prevalent form of government.

In the nineteenth and twentieth centuries, there was a significant increase in the size and scale of government at the national level. This included the regulation of corporations and the development of the welfare state.

== Political science ==
=== Classification ===
In political science, it has long been a goal to create a typology or taxonomy of polities, as typologies of political systems are not obvious. Given the government's role in managing the state, any taxonomy of polities would need to include all forms of monopoly on legitimate force to be complete.

Superficially, all governments have an official de jure or ideal form. The United States is a federal constitutional republic, while the former Soviet Union was a federal socialist republic. However, self-identification is not objective, and as Kopstein and Lichbach argue, defining regimes can be tricky, especially de facto, when both its government and its economy deviate in practice. For example, Voltaire argued that "the Holy Roman Empire is neither Holy, nor Roman, nor an Empire". In practice, the Soviet Union was a centralized autocratic one-party state under Joseph Stalin.

Identifying a form of government can be challenging because many political systems originate from socio-economic movements, and the parties that carry those movements into power often name themselves after those ideologies. These parties may have competing political ideologies and strong ties to particular forms of government. As a result, the movements themselves can sometimes be mistakenly considered as forms of government, rather than the ideologies that influence the governing system.

Other complications include general non-consensus or deliberate "distortion or bias" of reasonable technical definitions of political ideologies and associated forms of governing, due to the nature of politics in the modern era. For example: The meaning of "conservatism" in the United States has little in common with the way the word's definition is used elsewhere. As Ribuffo notes, "what Americans now call conservatism much of the world calls liberalism or neoliberalism"; a "conservative" in Finland would be labelled a "socialist" in the United States. Since the 1950s, conservatism in the United States has been chiefly associated with right-wing politics and the Republican Party. However, during the era of segregation many Southern Democrats were conservatives, and they played a key role in the conservative coalition that controlled Congress from 1937 to 1963. (Note: Frederickson 2000, p. 12, quote: "...conservative southern Democrats viewed warily the potential of New Deal programs to threaten the region's economic dependence on cheap labor while stirring the democratic ambitions of the disfranchised and undermining white supremacy.")

=== Social-political ambiguity ===
Opinions vary by individuals concerning the types and properties of governments that exist. "Shades of gray" are commonplace in any government and its corresponding classification. Even the most liberal democracies limit rival political activity to one extent or another while the most tyrannical dictatorships must organize a broad base of support thereby creating difficulties for "pigeonholing" governments into narrow categories. Examples include the claims of the United States as being a plutocracy rather than a democracy since some American voters believe elections are being manipulated by wealthy Super PACs. Some consider that government is to be reconceptualised where in times of climatic change the needs and desires of the individual are reshaped to generate sufficiency for all.

== Measurement of governing ==
The quality of a government can be measured by Government effectiveness index, which relates to political efficacy and state capacity. If a government no longer directs a monopoly on force, or if that monopoly loses legitimacy, it is no longer leading the state. The political bias of a government can be measured relative to the median voter. The fiscal sustainability of a government measures the sustainability of fiscal policies, government budget balances and the fiscal gap in the long-term. For some countries the current government budget balances and unfunded mandates were found unsustainable, with higher burdens for younger generations.

== Forms ==
=== Classical political philosophy ===
Plato in his book The Republic (375 BC) divided governments into five basic types, four being existing forms and one being Plato's ideal form which exists "only in speech". These five regimes progressively degenerate from one to the next, starting from aristocracy and ending in tyranny:

- Aristocracy – rule by the best-qualified, in Plato's view, carefully-educated philosopher-kings, possessing both wisdom and virtue, not a hereditary class of nobility;
- Timocracy – rule by honour, in which rulers are honoured but not necessarily wise or wholly virtuous;
- Oligarchy – rule by the wealthiest few, or in modern terms, a plutocracy;
- Democracy – rule by free and equal citizens, which in Plato's time, typically allocated political offices by sortition;
- Tyranny – arbitrary rule by a despotic individual.

In his Politics, Aristotle elaborates on Plato's five regimes discussing them in relation to the government of one, of the few, and of the many. Aristotle developed a sixfold classification with three good forms of government (monarchy, aristocracy, and timocracy) whose rule is consistent with the common good contrasted against three corrupt forms (tyranny, oligarchy, and democracy) aiming only to the benefit of those holding power. Governments could also possess mixed constitutions combining aspects of these basic six forms.

=== Renaissance and early modern political philosophy ===
The Aristotelian sixfold classification of forms of government became the prevailing model after Aristotle's Politics and Nicomachean Ethics were translated into Latin in the 13th century. It remained so throughout the Renaissance, shaping ideas regarding mixed government and classical republicanism. However, by the 16th century its relevance had faded, giving way to a threefold classification consisting of monarchy, aristocracy, and democracy in the works of early modern political philosophers such as Jean Bodin and Thomas Hobbes. Hobbes dismissed the distinction between good and bad forms of government as subjective, and classified them according to who possessed sovereignty, that is, the authority to rule: either one person (an autocracy), a select group of people (an aristocracy or, in its broader modern sense, an oligarchy), or the people as a whole (a democracy). Hobbes stated on their classification:

The difference of Commonwealths consisteth in the difference of the sovereign, or the person representative of all and every one of the multitude. And because the sovereignty is either in one man, or in an assembly of more than one; and into that assembly either every man hath right to enter, or not everyone, but certain men distinguished from the rest; it is manifest there can be but three kinds of Commonwealth. For the representative must need to be one man or more; and if more, then it is the assembly of all, or but of a part. When the representative is one man, then is the Commonwealth a monarchy; when an assembly of all that will come together, then it is a democracy or popular Commonwealth; when an assembly of a part only, then it is called an aristocracy. In other kinds of Commonwealth there can be none: for either one, or more, or all, must have the sovereign power (which I have shown to be indivisible) entire.

=== Modern basic political systems ===
According to Yale professor Juan José Linz, there are three main types of political systems today: democracies and totalitarian regimes with a continuum of hybrid regimes between them, and, sui generis authoritarian regimes distinct from both and which neither pursue a totalitarian conception of society nor maintain pretenses of a ongoing democratic transition. In addition, Linz and others acknowledge exceptions, particularly sultanistic regimes and regimes which continue premodern, traditional forms of political legitimacy, such as monarchy. Scholars generally characterise dictatorships as being either authoritarian or totalitarian, though some, such as Linz, reserve 'dictatorship' for its historic meaning, referring to an interim provisional government that suspends constitutional norms and assume extraordinary powers during a state of emergency, rather than equating it only with modern forms of autocratic rule.

=== Common forms ===
==== Autocracy ====
An autocracy is a system of government in which supreme power is concentrated in the hands of one person, whose decisions are subject to neither external legal restraints nor regularized mechanisms of popular control (except perhaps for the implicit threat of a coup d'état or mass insurrection). Absolute monarchy is a historically prevalent form of autocracy, wherein a monarch governs as a singular sovereign with no limitation on royal prerogative. Most absolute monarchies are hereditary, however some, notably the Holy See, are elected by an electoral college (such as the college of cardinals, or prince-electors). Other forms of autocracy include tyranny, despotism, and dictatorship.

==== Aristocracy ====
Aristocracy (Note: Ancient Greek: ἀριστοκρατία aristokratía, from ἄριστος aristos "excellent", and κράτος kratos "power".) is a form of government that places power in the hands of a small, elite ruling class, such as a hereditary nobility or privileged caste. This class exercises minority rule, often as a landed timocracy, wealthy plutocracy, or oligarchy.

Many monarchies were aristocracies, although in modern constitutional monarchies, the monarch may have little effective power. The term aristocracy could also refer to the non-peasant, non-servant, and non-city classes in feudalism.

==== Democracy ====
National governments which self-identify as democracies; National governments which do not self-identify as democracies

Governments recognised as "electoral democracies" as of 2022 by the Freedom in the World survey (Note: Conducted by the American think tank Freedom House, which is largely funded by the US government.)

Some governments combine both direct and indirect democratic governance, wherein the citizenry selects representatives to administer day-to-day governance, while also reserving the right to govern directly through popular initiatives, referendums (plebiscites), and the right of recall. In a constitutional democracy the powers of the majority are exercised within the framework of representative democracy, but the constitution limits majority rule, usually through the provision by all of certain universal rights, such as freedom of speech or freedom of association.

==== Republics ====
A republic is a form of government in which the country is considered a "public matter" (Latin: res publica), not the private concern or property of the rulers, and where offices of states are subsequently directly or indirectly elected or appointed rather than inherited. The people, or some significant portion of them, have supreme control over the government and where offices of state are elected or chosen by elected people.

A common simplified definition of a republic is a government where the head of state is not a monarch. Montesquieu included both democracies, where all the people have a share in rule, and aristocracies or oligarchies, where only some of the people rule, as republican forms of government.

==== Federalism ====
Federalism is a political concept in which a group of members are bound together by covenant with a governing representative head. The term "federalism" is also used to describe a system of government in which sovereignty is constitutionally divided between a central governing authority and constituent political units, variously called states, provinces or otherwise. Federalism is a system based upon democratic principles and institutions in which the power to govern is shared between national and provincial/state governments, creating what is often called a federation. Proponents are often called federalists.

== Institutions ==
The organization, exercise, and constraints of power in a country are shaped by political institutions. Such institutions can increase the stability of a government.

=== Branches ===
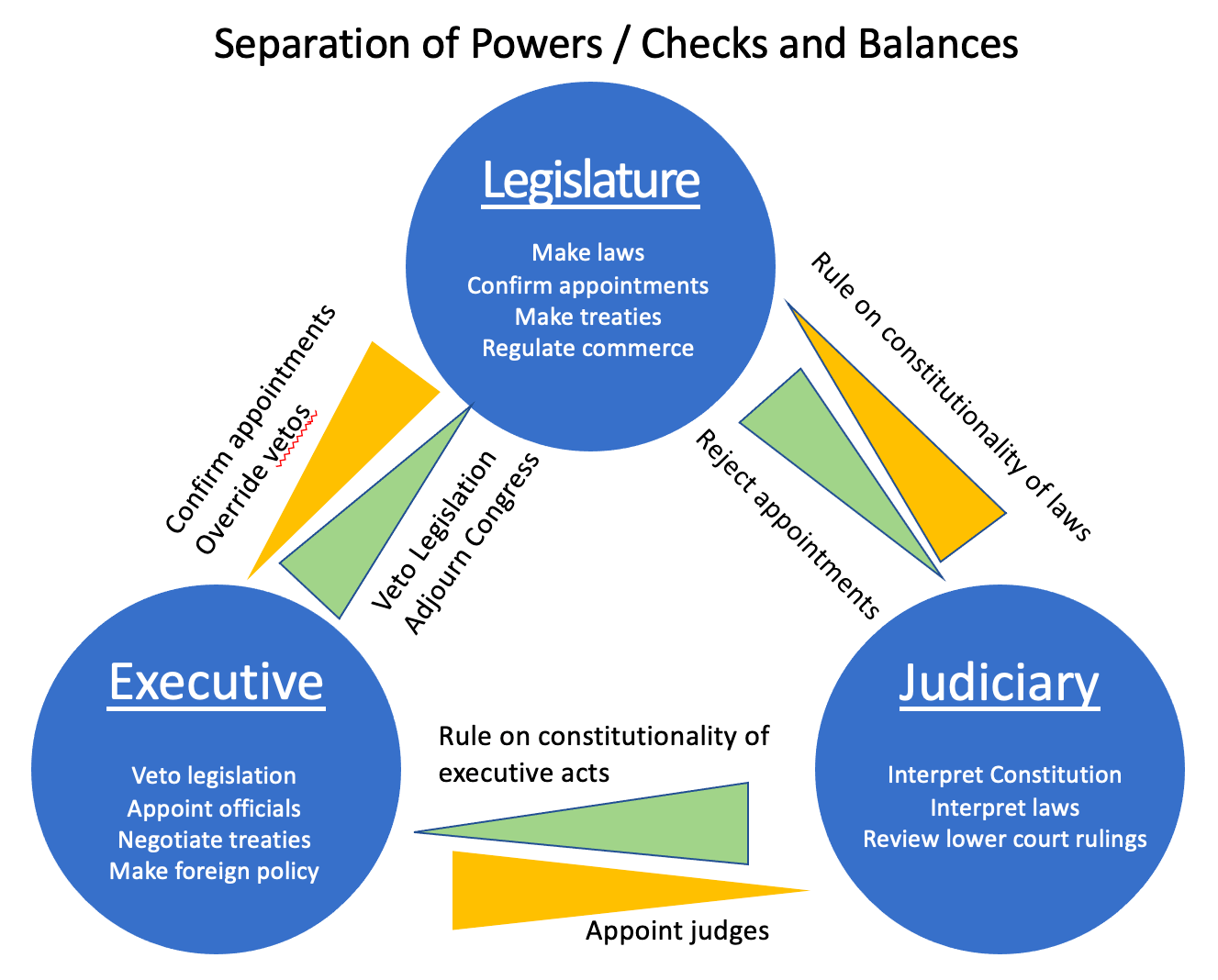
Separation of powers in the US government, demonstrating the trias politica model

Governments are often organised into three branches with separate powers: a legislature, an executive, and a judiciary; this is sometimes called the trias politica model. However, in parliamentary and semi-presidential systems, branches of government often intersect, having shared membership and overlapping functions. Many governments have fewer or additional branches, such as an independent electoral commission or auditory branch.

=== Party system ===
A majority government is a government by one or more governing parties together holding an absolute majority of seats in the parliament, in contrast to a minority government in which they have only a plurality of seats and often depend on a confidence-and-supply arrangement with other parties. A coalition government is one in which multiple parties cooperate to form a government as part of a coalition agreement. In a single-party government, a single party forms a government without the support of a coalition, as is typically the case with majority governments, but even a minority government may consist of just one party unable to find a willing coalition partner at the moment.

=== Administrative levels ===
Governments are typically organised into hierarchical levels of government, forming nested jurisdictions with differing powers and responsibilities, and which comprise the administrative divisions of a sovereign state. The number of distinct administrative levels varies, but the lowest and most immediate levels of government are those of local government. The highest level of a sovereign state is the central government or, for federations, the federal government. Local and regional governments vary in their demand for and degree of devolution or regional autonomy from central or federal government. Since the mid-20th century, most sovereign states voluntarily participate in international organisations, such as the United Nations, with varying degrees of integration, which coordinate their activities through various modes of global governance. In some cases, a nation-state may be deprived of self-governance and self-determination, being administered as a colony or client state of another state or empire.

== Public administration ==
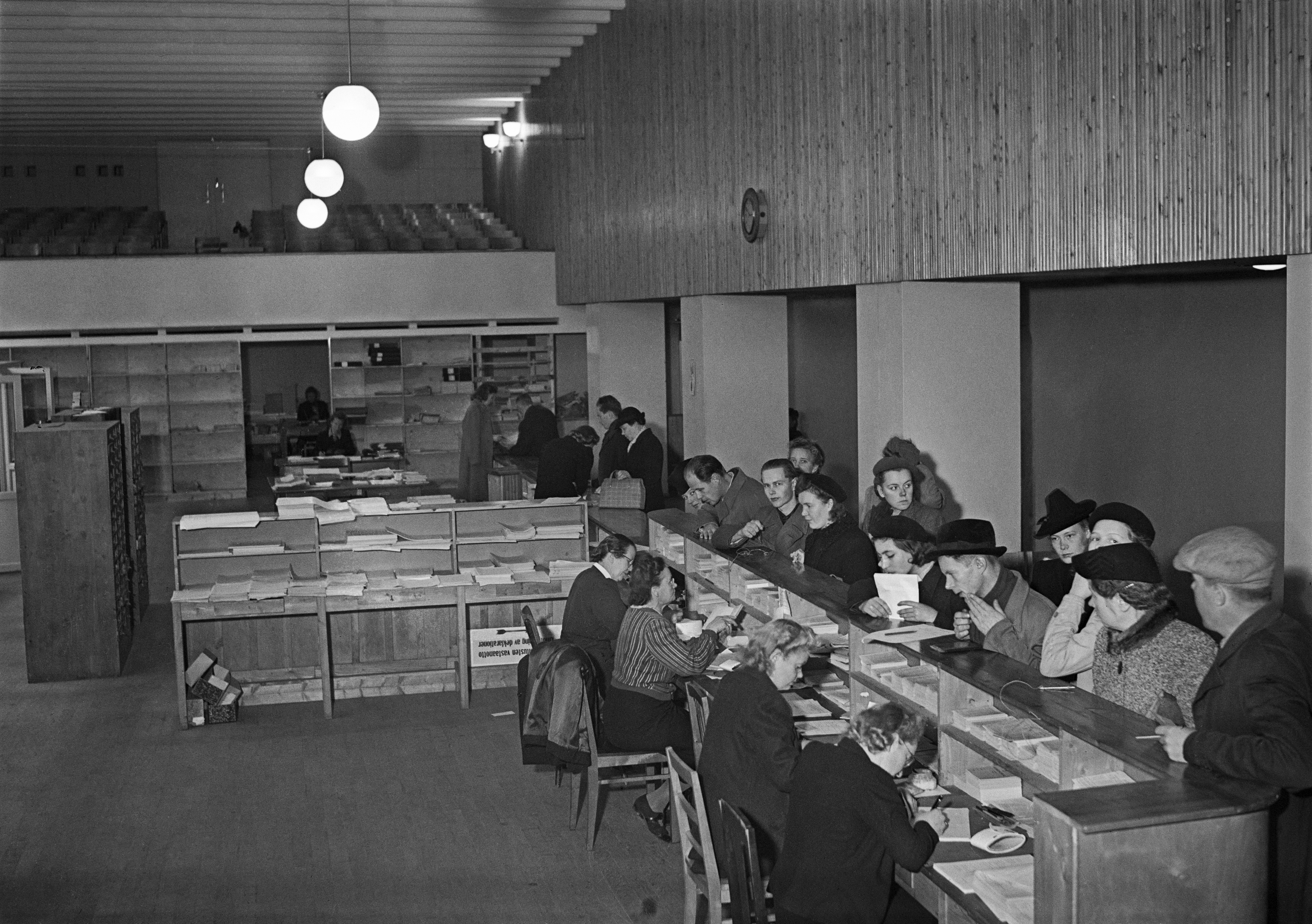
Tax office in Finland, 1945

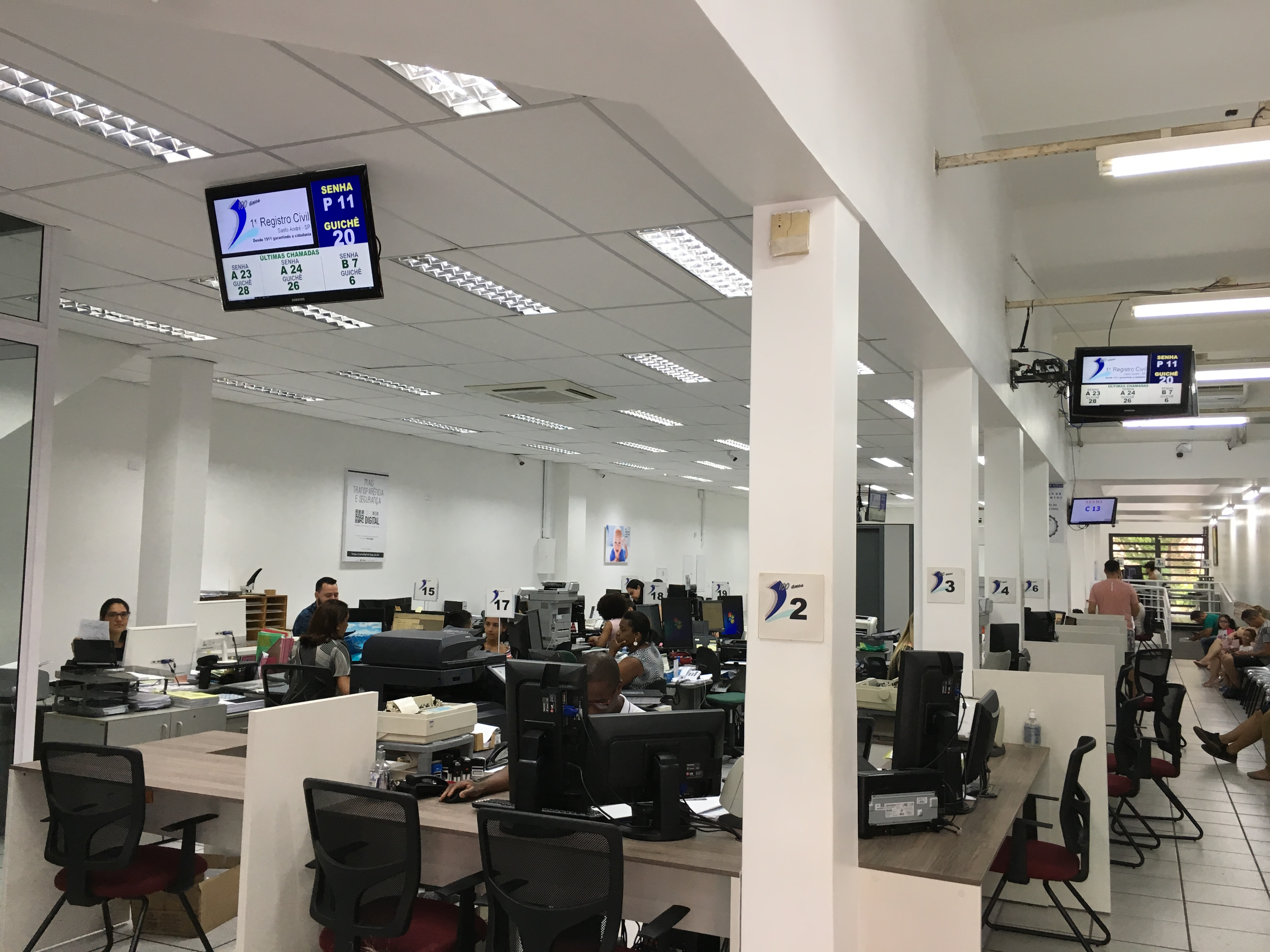
1st Vital Records Office of Santo André, São Paulo, Brazil, 2019

Governmental property, state-owned enterprises, public services, civil servants and employees of the government together compose the public sector of the economy. In modern developed countries, public services (or services of general interest) often include courts, education, emergency services, health care, military, and policing, among others.

The United Nations Sustainable Development Goal 5 is a global initiative that aims to influence the provision of public services and infrastructure to marginalized demographics.

== Public policy ==
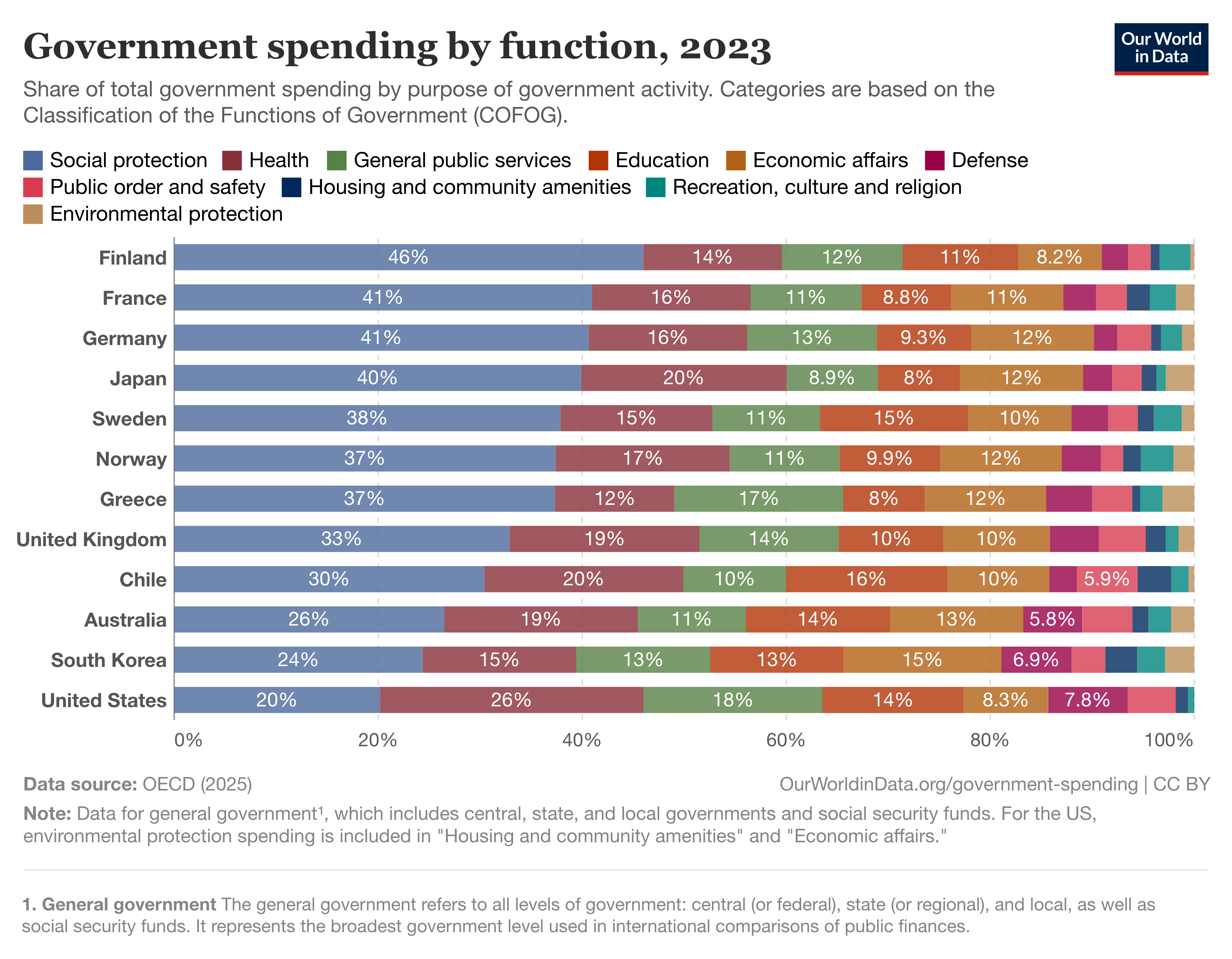
Government spending composition by country (2023)

Public policy can be considered the sum of a government's direct and indirect activities. It includes various aspects of life such as education, health care, employment, finance, economics, transportation, and all over elements of society. Public policy making can be characterized as a dynamic, complex, and interactive system through which public problems are identified and resolved through the creation of new policy or reform of existing policy. Government spending includes social protection, publicly funded health care, general public services, education, economic affairs, public security, defense, recreation and culture. The government budget balance affects the government bond yields.

== Maps ==
Democracy is the most popular form of government. More than half of the nations in the world are democracies—97 of 167, as of 2021. However, the world is becoming more authoritarian with a quarter of the world's population under democratically backsliding governments.

Democracy Index by the Economist Intelligence Unit, as of 2017: Full Democracies 9–10 8–9 / Flawed Democracies 7–8 6–7 / Hybrid Regimes 5–6 4–5 / Authoritarian Regimes 3–4 2–3 0–2

A world map distinguishing countries of the world as federations (green) from unitary states (blue) Unitary states Federations

== See also ==
- Civics
- Comparative government
- Constitutional economics
- Deep state
- E-democracy
- E-government
- History of politics
- List of European Union member states by political system
- Natural rights and legal rights
- Political economy
- Political history
- World government
