= Hybrid regime =

Regime combining autocratic and democratic features

A hybrid regime (Note: Scholars use a variety of terms to encompass the "grey zones" between full autocracies and full democracies. Such terms include: competitive authoritarianism, semi-authoritarianism, hybrid authoritarianism, electoral authoritarianism, liberal autocracy, delegative democracy, illiberal democracy, guided democracy, semi-democracy, deficient democracy, defective democracy, and hybrid democracy.) is a type of political system often created as a result of an incomplete democratic transition from an authoritarian regime to a democratic one (or vice versa). (Note: Debates over what can be called "hybrid" still exist, see Hybrid regime § Definition.) Hybrid regimes are categorized as having a combination of autocratic features with democratic ones and can simultaneously hold political repressions and regular elections.

According to some definitions and measures, hybrid regimes are commonly found in developing countries with abundant natural resources such as petro-states.

Scholars disagree about the durability of hybrid regimes. Some describe them as a persistent "gray zone" rather than a stage in a transition to democracy, while quantitative studies find that regimes combining democratic and autocratic features are less durable than either democracies or autocracies and more prone to civil war. Most competitive authoritarian regimes identified in the early 1990s subsequently either democratized or were replaced by new autocracies.

There has been a rise in hybrid regimes since the end of the Cold War.

The term hybrid regime arises from a polymorphic view of political regimes that oppose the dichotomy of autocracy or democracy. Modern scholarly analysis of hybrid regimes focuses attention on the decorative nature of democratic institutions (elections do not lead to a change of power, different media broadcast the government point of view, and the opposition in parliament votes the same way as the ruling party, among others). While most maintain a veneer of democracy to appease international standards, some scholars contend these regimes deliberately imitate a full dictatorship to project strength and suppress internal dissent.

Overall, there is no consensus among researchers about how hybrid regimes should be defined or measured. Accordingly, there is much disagreement about which countries are considered to be hybrid regimes, and any description of what typical hybrid regimes look like needs to be seen in the context of specific definitions and measures. Democratic backsliding is the primary cause of the growth of hybrid regime typologies.

== Definition ==
Scholars vary on the definition of hybrid regimes based on their primary academic discipline. According to Christoph Mohamad-Klotzbach, "Some scholars argue that deficient democracies and deficient autocracies can be seen as examples of hybrid regimes, whereas others argue that hybrid regimes combine characteristics of both democratic and autocratic regimes." Scholars also debate if these regimes are in transition or are inherently a stable political system. In 1995, Terry Karl introduced the notion of a "hybrid" regime, which was simply defined as "combining democratic and authoritarian elements". According to Professor Matthijs Bogaards, hybrid types are:

not diminished subtypes, since they do not lack the full development of a characteristic, but rather they exhibit a mixture of characteristics of both basic types, so that they simultaneously combine autocratic and democratic dimensions or institutions

Pippa Norris defined hybrid regimes as:

a system characterized by weak checks and balances on executive powers, flawed or even suspended elections, fragmented opposition forces, state restrictions on media freedoms, intellectuals, and civil society organizations, curbs on the independence of the judiciary and disregard for rule of law, the abuse of human rights by the security forces, and tolerance of authoritarian values.

Henry E. Hale defined hybrid regimes as:

a political regime that combines some democratic and some autocratic elements in a significant manner. It is not, however, a mere half-way category: hybrid regimes have their own distinct dynamics that do not simply amount to half of what we would see in a democracy plus half of what we would see in an autocracy.

Leonardo Morlino defined hybrid regimes as:

a set of institutions that have been persistent, be they stable or unstable, for about a decade, have been preceded by authoritarianism, a traditional regime (possibly with colonial characteristics), or even a minimal democracy and are characterized by the break-up of limited pluralism and forms of independent, autonomous participation, but the absence of at least one of the four aspects of a minimal democracy

Professor Jeffrey C. Isaac defined hybrid regimes as:

Hybrid regimes have the common feature that they all have competition, although the political elite in power deliberately rearranges state regulations and the political arena so as to grant itself undue advantages.

=== History ===
Countries autocratizing (red) or democratizing (blue) substantially and significantly (2010–2020). Countries in grey are substantially unchanged.

The third wave of democratization from the 1970s onward has led to the emergence of hybrid regimes that are neither fully democratic nor fully authoritarian. Neither the concept of illiberal democracy nor the concept of electoral authoritarianism fully describes these hybrid regimes.

Since the end of the Cold War, such regimes gradually outnumbered the classical dictatorships. Authoritarian regimes change, and when countries liberalize, limited elections tend to follow, sooner or later. "Liberal democracy" is often purported when, in fact, this process basically froze "halfway." In relation to regimes that were previously called "transitional" in the 1980s, the term hybrid regime began to be used. According to Thomas Carothers:

the majority of "transitional countries" are neither completely dictatorial nor aspiring to democracy, and by and large they cannot be called transitional. They are located in the politically stable gray zone, changes in which may not take place for decades. Thus, he stated that hybrid regimes must be considered without the assumption that they will ultimately become democracies. These hybrid regimes were called semi-authoritarianism or electoral authoritarianism.

Hybrid regimes have evolved to lean more authoritarian while keeping some democratic traits. One of the main issues with authoritarian rule is the ability to control the threats from the masses, and democratic elements in hybrid regimes can reduce social tension between the masses and the elite. After the third wave of democratization, some regimes became stuck in the transition to democracy, causing the creation of weak democratic institutions. This results from a lack of institutional ownership during critical points in the transition period leading the regime into a gray zone between democracy and autocracy.

These developments have caused some scholars to believe that hybrid regimes are not poorly functioning democracies, but rather new forms of authoritarian regimes. Defective democratic stability is an indicator to explain and measure these new forms of autocracies. Additionally, approval ratings of political leaders play an important role in these types of regimes, and democratic elements can drive up the ratings of a strongman leader, creating a tool not utilized previously. As of the 2020s, 'hybrid regime' is a term used to explain a growing field of political development where authoritarian leaders incorporate elements of democracy that stabilize their regimes.

== Indicators ==
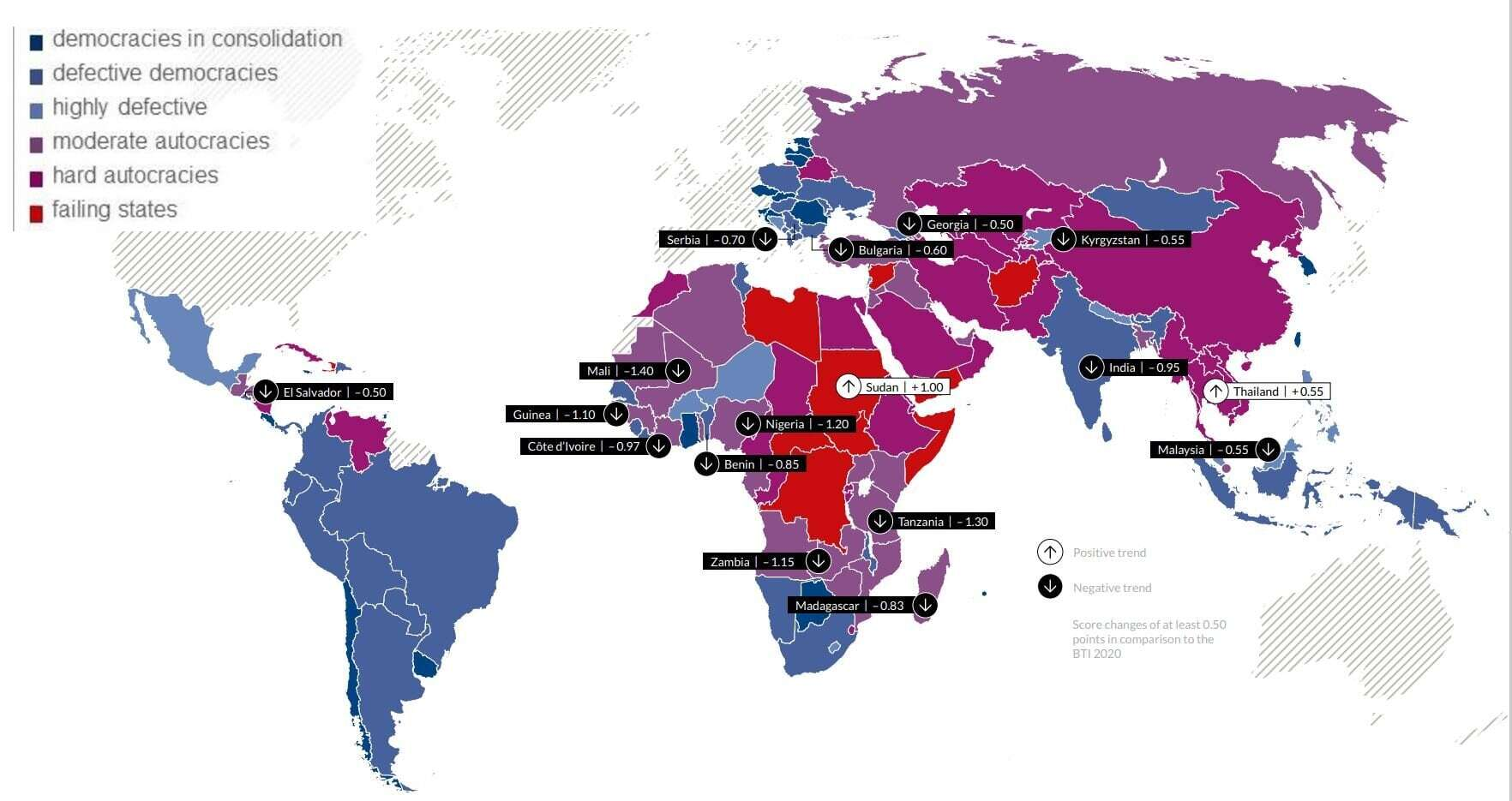
Global trend report Bertelsmann Transformation Index 2022

According to Guillermo O'Donnell, Philippe C. Schmitter, Larry Diamond, and Thomas Carothers, signs of a hybrid regime include:

1. The presence of external attributes of democracy (elections, multi-party system, legal opposition).
2. A low degree of representation of the interests of citizens in the process of political decision-making (incapacity of associations of citizens, for example, trade unions, or that they are in state control).
3. A low level of political participation.
4. The declarative nature of political rights and freedoms (formally, there is in fact difficult implementation).
5. A low level of trust in political institutions by its citizenry.

=== Transition types ===
==== Autocratization ====
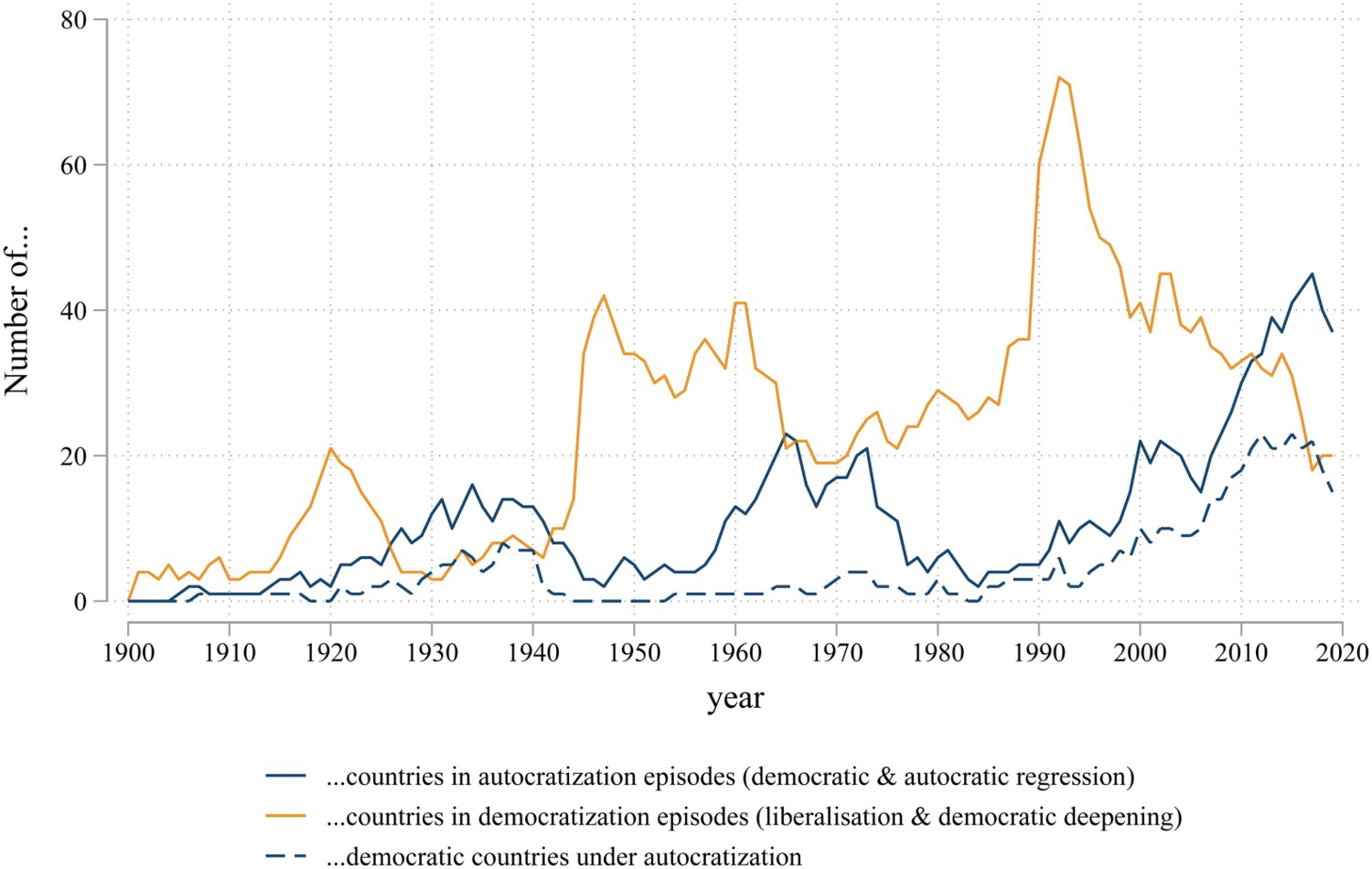
Since c. 2010, the number of countries autocratizing (blue) is higher than those democratizing (yellow).

Democratic backsliding (Note: Other names include democratic decline, de-democratization, democratic erosion, democratic decay, democratic recession, democratic regression, and democratic deconsolidation.) is a form of autocratization, a process of structural government transition from democracy toward authoritarianism in which the exercise of political power becomes less limited and more arbitrary and repressive. The process typically restricts the space for public contest and political participation in the process of government selection. Democratic backsliding involves the weakening of democratic institutions, such as the peaceful transition of power or free and fair elections, or the violation of individual rights that underpin democracies, especially freedom of expression.

==== Democratization ====
Democratization, or democratisation, is the structural government transition from an authoritarian government to a more democratic political regime, including substantive political changes moving in a democratic direction. The opposite process of democratic transition is known as democratic backsliding or autocratization. Whether and to what extent democratization occurs can be influenced by various factors, including economic development, historical legacies, civil society, and international processes. Some accounts of democratization emphasize how elites drove democratization, whereas other accounts emphasize grassroots bottom-up processes. How democratization occurs has also been used to explain other political phenomena, such as whether a country goes to a war or whether its economy grows.

== Measurement ==
There are various democratic freedom indices produced by academic researchers and intergovernmental non-governmental organizations that publish assessments of the world's political systems, according to their own definitions, and many of them include measures of hybrid regimes. However, because these various indices use different definitions and methods, they often disagree on which countries should be classified as hybrid regimes.

=== Democracy Index ===
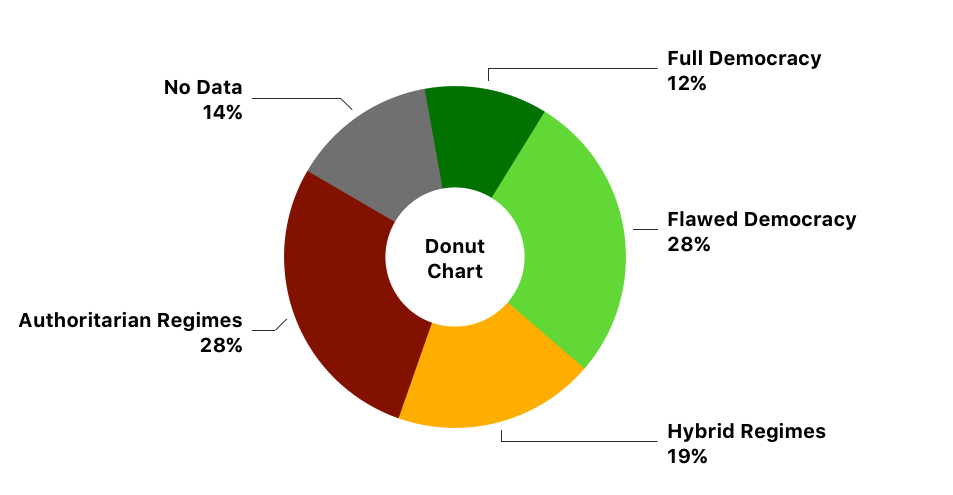
Democracy index types

According to the Democracy Index compiled by the Economist Intelligence Unit, there are 34 hybrid regimes, representing approximately 20% of countries, encompassing 17.2% to 20.5% of the world's population. The EIU Democracy Index is "based on ratings across 60 indicators, grouped into five categories: electoral process and pluralism, civil liberties, the functioning of government, political participation, and political culture." The Democracy Index defines hybrid regimes with the following characteristics:

- Electoral fraud or irregularities occur regularly
- Pressure is applied to political opposition
- Corruption is widespread and rule of law tends to be weak
- Media is pressured and harassed
- There are issues in the functioning of governance

The 2024 Economist Intelligence Unit Democracy Index: Full democracies 9.00–10.00 8.00–8.99 Flawed democracies 7.00–7.99 6.00–6.99 / Hybrid regimes 5.00–5.99 4.00–4.99 / Authoritarian regimes 3.00–3.99 2.00–2.99 1.00–1.99 0.00–0.99

As of 2024, the countries considered hybrid regimes by the "Democracy Index" are:

- Romania
- Papua New Guinea
- Senegal
- Paraguay
- Malawi
- Zambia
- Peru
- Fiji
- Bhutan
- Liberia
- Armenia
- Hong Kong
- Honduras
- Madagascar
- Mexico
- Georgia
- Ecuador
- Tanzania
- Bosnia and Herzegovina
- Kenya
- Morocco
- Ukraine
- Tunisia
- El Salvador
- Nepal
- Guatemala
- Uganda
- Gambia
- Bangladesh
- Benin
- Sierra Leone
- Bolivia
- Turkey
- Ivory Coast
- Nigeria
- Angola

=== Global State of Democracy Report ===
According to the "Global State of Democracy Report" by International Institute for Democracy and Electoral Assistance (IDEA), there are twenty hybrid regimes. International IDEA compiles data from 12 different sources, including expert surveys and observational data, which includes the extent to which voting rights are inclusive. IDEA defined hybrid regimes as:

combining elements of authoritarianism with democracy ... These often adopt the formal characteristics of democracy (while allowing little real competition for power) with weak respect for basic political and civil rights

As of 2021 the countries considered hybrid regimes by the "Global State of Democracy Report" are:

- Angola
- Benin
- Côte d'Ivoire
- Democratic Republic of the Congo
- Ethiopia
- Gabon
- Jordan
- Kuwait
- Kyrgyzstan
- Libya
- Mauritania
- Morocco
- Mozambique
- Nigeria
- Serbia
- Singapore
- Tanzania
- Togo
- Tunisia
- Turkey

=== V-Dem Democracy Indices ===
Map of V-Dem Electoral Democracy Index in 2024: 0.900–1.000 0.800–0.899 0.700–0.799 0.600–0.699 / 0.500–0.599 0.400–0.499 0.300–0.399 0.200–0.299 / 0.100–0.199 0.000–0.099 No data

The V-Dem Democracy Indices compiled by the V-Dem Institute at the University of Gothenburg classify all political regimes worldwide into four primary types. The two intermediate categories, electoral autocracies and electoral democracies, lie in between the most democratic (liberal democracy) and most autocratic (closed autocracy). In 2016, there were 118 countries in the electoral democracy and autocracy categories, and in 2021 there were 115. The 115 countries in 2021 consisted of about 60% of the world's population.

=== Freedom House ===
Freedom House ratings for European Union and surrounding states, in 2019 Free Partly free Not free

Freedom House measures the level of political and economic governance in 29 countries from Central Europe to Central Asia. Freedom House assigns "scores to countries and territories across the globe on 10 indicators of political rights (e.g., whether there is a realistic opportunity for opposition parties to gain power through elections) and 15 indicators of civil liberties (e.g., whether there is a free and independent media)." Freedom House classifies transitional or hybrid regimes as:

Countries that are typically electoral democracies where democratic institutions are fragile and substantial challenges to the protection of political rights and civil liberties exist

In 2024, Freedom House classified 11 of 29 countries analyzed as "Transitional or Hybrid Regimes":

- Armenia
- Georgia
- Albania
- Bosnia and Herzegovina
- Kosovo
- Ukraine
- Hungary
- Moldova
- Serbia
- North Macedonia
- Montenegro

== Characteristics ==
=== Human rights ===
The instability of anocratic regimes causes human rights violations to be significantly higher within anocracies than democratic regimes. According to Maplecroft's 2014 Human Rights Risk Atlas, eight of the top ten worst human-rights-violating countries are anocracies. In addition, the report categorized every current anocracy as "at risk" or at "extreme risk" of human rights offenses.

The high correlation between anocratic regimes and human rights abuses denotes the nonlinear progression in a country's transition from an autocracy to a democracy. Generally, human rights violations substantially decrease when a certain threshold of full democracy is reached. However, human rights abuses tend to remain the same or even to increase as countries move from an autocratic to an anocratic regime.

During the revolutions of the Arab Spring, Libya, Egypt, and Yemen, all of the countries made relative progress towards more democratic regimes. With many of the authoritarian practices of their governments remaining, those states currently fall under the category of anocracies. They are also listed as some of the most extreme human-rights-violating countries in the world. The violations include torture, police brutality, slavery, discrimination, unfair trials, and restricted freedom of expression. Research has shown that political protests, such as those that occurred during the Arab Spring, generally lead to an increase in human right violations, as the existing government tries to retain power and influence over governmental opposition. Therefore, transitioning governments tend to have high levels of human rights abuses.

In its annual Freedom in the World report, Freedom House scored states' violations of civil liberties on a seven-point scale, with a score of seven representing the highest percentage of violations. Freedom House defined civil liberty violations as the infringement of freedom of expression, associational and organizational rights, rule of law, and individual rights. Most consolidated democracies received scores of one, but almost all anocracies were scored between four and six because of the high percentage of civil liberties violations in most anocratic regimes.

=== Violence ===
Statistics show that anocracies are ten times more likely to experience intrastate conflict than democracies and twice as likely as autocracies. One explanation for the increase in violence and conflict within anocracies is a hypothesis known as More Murder in the Middle (MMM). The hypothesis argues that the unstable characteristics of anocratic regimes, which include the presence of divided elites, inequality, and violent challengers who threaten the legitimacy of the current social order, cause governing elites to resort to much more political repression or state terror than do democratic or authoritarian regimes. That leads to high levels of what are termed "life-integrity violations", which include state-sponsored genocide, extrajudicial executions, and torture.

State life-integrity violations can be categorized as acts of state terror. Acts of terrorism by both governmental and outside groups are generally higher in transitioning anocratic governments than in either democratic or authoritarian regimes. Harvard Public Policy Professor Alberto Abadie argues that the tight control of an authoritarian regime is likely to discourage terrorist activities in the state. However, without the stability of a clear authoritarian rule or a consolidated democracy, anocracies are more open and susceptible to terrorist attacks. He notes that in Iraq and previously Spain and Russia, transitions from an authoritarian regime to a democracy were accompanied by temporary increases in terrorism.

According to the political terror scale (PTS), a data set that ranks state sponsored violence on a five-point scale, almost every anocracy is ranked as having a score between three and five. On the scale, a score of three indicates that in a state, "there is extensive political imprisonment, or a recent history of such imprisonment. Execution or other political murders and brutality may be common. Unlimited detention, with or without a trial, for political views is accepted." States are ranked as a four when "civil and political rights violations have expanded to large numbers of the population. Murders, disappearances and torture are a common part of life. In spite of its generality, on this level terror affects those who interest themselves in politics or ideas." Scores of five are given to states if "terror has expanded to the whole population. The leaders of these societies place no limits on the means or thoroughness with which they pursue personal or ideological goals." Although only eleven states were given scores of five in the 2012 Political Terror Scale report, four of those states, the Democratic Republic of the Congo, Eritrea, Somalia, and Sudan, were classified by the Polity data series as anocracies.

=== Civil war ===
There are differing views on whether or not anocracy leads to civil war. It is debated whether or not transitions between government regimes or political violence lead to civil war.

Civil wars in unstable countries are usually the outcome of a country's inability to meet the population's demands. The inability of the state to provide for the needs of the population leads to factionalism within the country. When factions are not able to get what they want, they take up arms against the state. Political scientist Barbara F. Walter has written that anocratic states are most at risk of civil war, with formerly dominant political groups more likely to start them than poorer and weaker groups.

Former democracies that transition to anocracy have a greater risk of being embroiled in civil conflict. The population's awareness of what rights they had as a democratic society may compel them to fight to regain their rights and liberties. On the other hand, autocracies that transition into anocracies are less likely to break out in civil war. Not all anocracies are unstable. There are many countries that are stable but are classified as anocracies, such as Russia. It is the transitional qualities associated with some anocracies that are predictive of civil conflict. The magnitude of the transition also affects the probability of a civil conflict. The higher the magnitude of the transition, the higher the likelihood of civil war.

However, some international relations experts use the Polity data series in the formulation of their hypothesis and study, which presents a problem because the Polity IV system uses violence and civil war as factors in its computation of a country's Polity score. Two components, "the degree of institutionalization, or regulation, of political competition", and "the extent of government restriction on political competition", are problematic to use in any study involving Polity IV and civil war in anocratic governments. In the numeric rating system of one of these parts of Polity IV, unregulated, "may or may be characterized by violent conflict among partisan groups." The other component states that "there are relatively stable and enduring political groups – but competition among them is intense, hostile, and frequently violent." The only thing that can be deduced concretely is that political violence tends to lead to civil war. There is no solid evidence to support that political institutions in an anocracy lead to civil war.

=== Broadness and complexity ===
While the first three characteristics capture the instability of anocracies, another feature of anocratic regimes is their broad descriptiveness. Anocracy describes a regime type with a mix of institutional characteristics that either constrains or promotes the democratic process, "encapsulating a complex category encompassing many institutional arrangements". Although anocracies demonstrate some capacity for civil society and political participation, their autocratic and democratic counterparts show considerably more or less capabilities.

== Typology ==
Countries in green claim to be a type of democracy while countries in red do not. Only Afghanistan, Brunei, Oman, Saudi Arabia, the UAE, Burkina Faso and the Vatican do not claim to be democratic.

Scholars organize hybrid regimes into several key sub-types and typologies based on where they fall in the "grey zone" between full democracies and closed autocracies.

=== Electoral authoritarianism ===
Electoral authoritarianism means that democratic institutions are imitative and, due to numerous systematic violations of liberal democratic norms, in fact adhere to authoritarian methods. Electoral authoritarianism can be competitive and hegemonic, and the latter does not necessarily mean election irregularities. A. Schedler calls electoral authoritarianism a new form of authoritarian regime, not a hybrid regime or illiberal democracy. Moreover, a purely authoritarian regime does not need elections as a source of legitimacy, while non-alternative elections, appointed at the request of the ruler, are not a sufficient condition for considering the regime conducting them to be hybrid.

Electoral autocracy is a hybrid regime, in which democratic institutions are imitative and adhere to authoritarian methods. In these regimes, regular elections are held, but they are accused of failing to reach democratic standards of freedom and fairness. However, while most researchers agree on this broad definition of electoral autocracy, there is substantial variation with regard to how researchers define and measure this type of regime. As a consequence, whether or not countries are classified as electoral autocracies is highly contingent on the specific definitions and measures applied.

=== Illiberal democracy ===
An illiberal democracy is a non-democratic governing system that "hides its practices behind formally democratic institutions and procedures." While there is no universal consensus on its precise definition, the term broadly describes governments that present themselves as liberal democracies while subtly suppressing opposing views. It has been described by researchers as a 21st-century form of fascism, maintaining electoral democracy while employing state power for largely nationalistic, anti-minority, and anti-freedom purposes, often under the leadership of dominant figures and their close associates.

=== Dominant-party system ===
A dominant-party system, or a one-party dominant system, is a political occurrence in which a single political party continuously dominates election results, overrunning opposition groups or parties. Any ruling party staying in power for more than one consecutive term may be considered a dominant party (also referred to as a predominant or hegemonic party). Some dominant parties were called the natural governing party, given their length of time in power.

=== Delegative democracy ===
In political science, delegative democracy is a mode of governance close to Caesarism, Bonapartism, caudillismo or populism with a strong leader in a newly created otherwise democratic government. The concept arose from Argentinian political scientist Guillermo O'Donnell, who notes that representative democracy as it exists is usually linked solely to highly developed capitalist countries. However, newly installed democracies do not seem to be on a path of becoming fully representative democracies, and instead exhibit authoritarian tendencies. O'Donnell calls the former delegative democracies, for they are not fully consolidated democracies but may be enduring.

=== Dictablanda ===
Dictablanda is a dictatorship in which civil liberties are allegedly preserved rather than destroyed, and authoritarian and democratic features are combined. Dictablanda is a pun on dictadura ("dictatorship") replacing dura, which by itself is a Spanish word meaning "hard", with blanda, meaning "soft".

=== Guided democracy ===
Guided democracy, also called directed democracy and managed democracy, is a term used for some hybrid regimes that were or are formally democratic governments that function as de facto authoritarian governments. Guided democracies are legitimized by elections, but these elections do not change the state's policies, motives, and goals. In a guided democracy, the government controls elections so that citizens appear to exercise democratic rights without truly changing public policy. The state's continuous use of propaganda techniques prevents the electorate from having a significant impact on policy.

The term "guided democracy" was used by Pakistani president Ayub Khan in the 1960s, by historians to refer to the Sanation regime of Poland from 1926 to 1939, and was an official name for Indonesian democracy under the Sukarno presidency in the early 1960s.

=== Liberal autocracy ===
A liberal autocracy is a non-democratic government that follows the principles of liberalism. Until the 20th century, most countries in Western Europe were "liberal autocracies, or at best, semi-democracies". One example of a "classic liberal autocracy" was the Austro-Hungarian Empire. According to Fareed Zakaria, a more recent example was British Hong Kong. He observed that until 1991, the British who had ruled Hong Kong since 1841 "had never held a meaningful election, but its government epitomized constitutional liberalism, protecting its citizens' basic rights (especially after World War II) and administering a relatively fair judiciary and bureaucracy". The term is also used to describe 19th and early 20th century constitutional monarchies that while had constitutional protection of liberties, also lacked wide democratic participation.

=== Anocracy or semi-democracy ===
Map of the world published by Our World in Data in 2015, showing countries color-coded according to their regime type, which was based on their score in the Polity IV data set. Closed anocracies are shown in orange (scores between −5 and 0) and open anocracies are shown in yellow (scores between 1 and 5).

The authors of the Polity data series use the term "anocracy" for hybrid regimes in general, and for "cases where the regime cannot be easily identified, such as during interregnum, interruption, or transition." The word anocracy is also used for hybrid regimes by some other authors, using definitions including a "regime that mixes democratic with autocratic features", and "a regime that permits some means of participation through opposition group behavior, but that has incomplete development of mechanisms to redress grievances". The term "semi-democratic" is also used for hybrid regimes.

Use of the word "anocracy" in English dates back to 1949, when R. F. C. Hull coined the term in his English translation of Martin Buber's 1946 work Pfade in Utopia (Paths in Utopia):

We see particularly clearly here that Kropotkin is ultimately attacking not State-order as such but only the existing order in all its forms; that his "anarchy", like Proudhon's, is in reality "anocracy" (ἀκρατία); not absence of government but absence of domination.

Buber's original German text used the word Akratie, a modern neoclassical compound formed from the privative prefix a- ('without') and -kratie ('rule, power, domination'), which Buber used in the sense of "absence of domination" or "non-domination". Hull chose to translate Akratie as "anocracy", inventing an English equivalent. In doing so, Hull also inserted the Ancient Greek word ἀκρατία akratia into parentheses, even though this word does not appear in Buber's original and in classical Greek actually means "lack of self-control" or "incontinence", not "absence of domination".

=== Defective democracy ===
Defective democracy (or flawed democracy) is a concept that was proposed by the political scientists Wolfgang Merkel, Hans-Jürgen Puhle, and Aurel S. Croissant at the beginning of the 21st century to subtilize the distinctions between totalitarian, authoritarian, and democratic political systems. It is based on the concept of embedded democracy. While there are four forms of defective democracy, how each nation reaches the point of defectiveness varies. One recurring theme is the geographical location of the nation, which includes the effects of the influence of surrounding nations in the region. Other causes for democracies being "defective" include their path of modernization, level of modernization, economic trends, social capital, civil society, political institutions, and education.

=== Competitive authoritarian regimes ===
Competitive authoritarianism is a hybrid regime structure and a subtype of authoritarianism. This regime type was defined to encapsulate states that contain formal democratic institutions that rulers view as the principal means of obtaining and exercising legitimate political authority against real opposition and other semblances of democratic political society, in which officials violate election freedom and fairness in order to retain power. The officials interfere with opposition organisations, failing to respect minimum conventional standards of democracy.

Three main instruments are used within competitive authoritarian regimes to maintain political power: the self-serving use of state institutions (regarding abuses of electoral and judicial institutions such as voter intimidation and voter fraud); the overuse of state resources (to gain influence and/or power over proportional representation media and use legal resources to disturb constitutional change); and the disruption of civil liberties (such as freedom of speech/press and association). In the post-Soviet era, continuing into the 2010s, the number of competitive authoritarian regimes increased.

== See also ==
- Benevolent dictatorship
- Delegative democracy
- Democracy-Dictatorship Index
- Totalitarian democracy
- Types of democracy

== Sources ==
- Bonet, Lluis; Zamorano, Mariano Martín (2021). "Cultural policies in illiberal democracies: a conceptual framework based on the Polish and Hungarian governing experiences". International Journal of Cultural Policy. 27 (5): 559–573. doi:10.1080/10286632.2020.1806829. S2CID 225285163.
- Christie, Kenneth (1998). "Illiberal Democracy, Modernisation and Southeast Asia". Theoria: A Journal of Social and Political Theory (91): 102–118. ISSN 0040-5817. JSTOR 41802094.
- DeVotta, Neil (2010). "From civil war to soft authoritarianism: Sri Lanka in comparative perspective". Global Change, Peace & Security. 22 (3): 331–343. doi:10.1080/14781158.2010.510268. S2CID 143630796.
- Kennedy, Kerry J, ed. (2021). "Is Democracy 'Dead'?". Civic Engagement in Changing Contexts. SpringerBriefs in Education. SpringerBriefs in Education. Singapore: Springer Publishing. pp. 57–68. doi:10.1007/978-981-16-7495-2_5. ISBN 978-981-16-7494-5.
- Mounk, Yascha (18 March 2020). The People Vs. Democracy - Why Our Freedom Is in Danger and How to Save It. Harvard University Press. ISBN 978-0-674-24502-0.
- Nyyssönen, Heino; Metsälä, Jussi (24 September 2020). "Liberal Democracy and its Current Illiberal Critique: The Emperor's New Clothes?". Europe-Asia Studies. 73 (2): 273–290. doi:10.1080/09668136.2020.1815654. "Thus, there is a real danger of 'pseudo-democracy', especially because elections can be manipulated and often are. In these cases, elections and other democratic institutions are simply adapted patterns of authoritarianism, not democracy in some imperfect form, having the dual purpose of legitimising the incumbent's rule and guarding it from any danger of democratic change."
- Plattner, Marc F. (January 2019). "Illiberal Democracy and the Struggle on the Right". Journal of Democracy. 30 (1): 5–19. doi:10.1353/jod.2019.0000.
- Sajó, András (2021). Ruling by Cheating: Governance in Illiberal Democracy. Cambridge University Press. ISBN 978-1-108-84463-5.
- Sajó, András; Uitz, Renáta; Holmes, Stephen, eds. (2021). Routledge Handbook of Illiberalism (1 ed.). Routledge. doi:10.4324/9780367260569. ISBN 978-1-000-47945-4.
- Schedler, Andreas (2006). Electoral Authoritarianism: The Dynamics of Unfree Competition. Lynne Rienner Publishers. ISBN 978-1-58826-415-2.
- Self, Darin (26 September 2022). "Illiberal Democracies and Democratic Backsliding". Oxford Bibliographies Online. doi:10.1093/obo/9780199756223-0352. ISBN 978-0-19-975622-3.
