= List of European Union member states by political system =

Freedom House ratings for European Union and surrounding states, as of 2024. Free Partly free Not free Non-EU member states are marked by a brighter colour.

Member states of the European Union use various forms of democracy. The European Union (EU) is a sui generis supranational union of states. At a European Council Summit held in Copenhagen, Denmark, on 21 June and 22 June 1993, the European Union defined the Copenhagen criteria regarding the conditions a candidate country has to fulfill to be considered eligible for accession to the European Union:

Membership criteria require that the candidate country must have achieved:

- stability of institutions guaranteeing democracy, the rule of law, human rights and respect for and protection of minorities;
- the existence of a functioning market economy as well as the capacity to cope with competitive pressure and market forces within the Union;
- the ability to take on the obligations of membership including adherence to the aims of political, economic and monetary union.

Consequently, all member states have direct elections, nominally democratic states that are considered to be "free" or "partly free" according to the criteria of Freedom House. As of 2020, there is no expert consensus on how to classify Hungary's regime type; Freedom House considers it a hybrid regime. As of 2015, all European Union member states are representative democracies; however, they do not all have the same political system, with most of the differences arising from different historical backgrounds.

Many of the states in the neighbourhood of the European Union are not considered to be "free" by the same criteria. Most European states neighbouring the European Union are considered to be "free" or "partly free" by Freedom House, with the exceptions of Azerbaijan, Belarus and Russia. On the other hand, almost all of the states in North Africa and Southwest Asia that neighbour the European Union are not considered to be "free", with the exceptions of Israel and Tunisia.

== Monarchism and republicanism ==
Monarchy Republic

At present, there are twelve monarchies in Europe, of which six are members of the European Union: Belgium, Denmark, Luxembourg, the Netherlands, Spain and Sweden, and six are not: Andorra, Liechtenstein, Monaco, Norway, the United Kingdom and the Vatican City. All six monarchies in the European Union are constitutional monarchies. In all six monarchies that are in the EU, the monarch is legally not vested with political power, or the monarch does not utilise the political powers vested in the office by convention. At the dawn of the 20th century, France was the only republic among the future members states of the European Union; the ascent of republicanism to the political mainstream only started at the beginning of the 20th century. In Belgium, the monarchy enjoys a lower degree of support than in other European monarchies, and is often questioned. Popular support for the monarchy has historically been higher in Flanders and lower in Wallonia; however, in recent decades these roles have reversed.

== Form of government ==
presidential republic Semi-presidential republic parliamentary republic parliamentary constitutional monarchy

There are three types of government systems in European politics: in a presidential system, the president is the head of state and the head of government; in a semi-presidential system, the president and the prime minister share a number of competences; finally, in a parliamentary republic, the president is a ceremonial figurehead who has few political competences. As with the definition of constitutional monarchies, sometimes the president does have non-ceremonial competences, but does not use them by constitutional convention; this is the case in Austria, for instance.

By definition, modern democratic constitutional monarchies are parliamentary, as there is no elected head of state who could assume non-ceremonial competences; of the twenty one republican member states of the European Union, only one is a presidential republic (Cyprus) and five are semi-presidential republics (France, Lithuania, Poland, Portugal and Romania). These five (semi-)presidential republics elect their president by direct popular vote. Among the fifteen parliamentary republics, eight do the same (namely Austria, Bulgaria, Croatia, Czech Republic, Finland, Ireland, Slovakia and Slovenia), whereas in the remaining seven (Estonia, Germany, Greece, Hungary, Italy, Latvia and Malta), the president is elected by parliament or other special representative body such as the German Bundesversammlung.

== Degree of self-governance ==
unitary state devolved state federacy federation Jamahiriya

Most of the European Union's member states are unitary states, which means that most of the competences lie with the central government and only minor or local issues are within the authority of regional governments. However, three states are federations (Austria, Belgium and Germany) of states or regions with equal competences, and six other states have either devolved certain powers to special regions or are federacies (or both):

- federacies:
  - in Denmark, the Faroe Islands and Greenland are autonomous (and neither is part of the European Union);
  - in Finland, Åland has substantial autonomy;
  - in France, the collectivité sui generis New Caledonia (which is not part of the European Union) has a large degree of autonomy;
  - in the Netherlands, the Caribbean island groups of Aruba, Curaçao and Sint Maarten are equal partners to the Netherlands within the Kingdom of the Netherlands;
- devolved states:
  - in Italy, the government has devolved a number of powers to the twenty regions, of which five have a very large degree of autonomy, namely Aosta Valley, Trentino-Alto Adige/Südtirol, Friuli-Venezia Giulia, Sardinia, and Sicily;
  - in Spain, the central government has devolved various powers to the historic nationalities among the autonomous communities, namely Andalusia, the Basque Country, Catalonia and Galicia.

== Parliamentary chambers ==
unicameral bicameral

A further distinction is the number of chambers in the national legislature; unicameral systems with one chamber or bicameral ones with a lower house and an upper house. Federations and countries with strong regional differences or regional identities are normally bicameral, to reflect the regions' interests in national bills. The states with the larger populations, from the Netherlands upwards, all have a bicameral system. Although there is a greater mix among the smaller states (some influenced by their federalist structure), the smallest states are on the whole unicameral.

While there had been legislatures with more than two chambers (tricameral and tetracameral ones), nowadays there are only unicameral and bicameral ones. Additionally, there are also differences in the degree of bicameralism. Whereas Italy is considered as having "perfect bicameralism", with both chambers being equal, most other bicameral systems restrict the upper house's powers to a certain extent. There is a slight trend towards unicameralism; some upper houses have seen their powers reduced or proposals to that end. Belgium's system has been reduced from a perfectly bicameral one to a nowadays de facto unicameral system. In 2009, Romania voted in favour of unicameralism, on a plebiscite, however the country still has a bicameral system, as of 2026. On the other hand, Ireland narrowly voted against abolishing their upper house in 2013, and Italy voted not to reduce its Senate's powers in 2016.

In the member states of the European Union, if the parliament has only one chamber, it is wholly directly elected in all cases. If there are two chambers, the lower house is directly elected in all cases, while the upper house can be directly elected (e.g. the Senate of Poland); or indirectly elected, for example, by regional legislatures (e.g. the Federal Council of Austria); or non-elected, but representing certain interest groups (e.g. the National Council of Slovenia).

== Listed by form of government ==
State	Government	Self-governance	Monarchy/Republic	Head of state	Head of government
Bulgaria	parliamentary	unitary	republic	President (Президент)	Minister-Chairman (Министър-председател)
Croatia	parliamentary	unitary	republic	President of the Republic (Predsjednik Republike)	President of the Government (Predsjednik Vlade)
Czech Republic	parliamentary	unitary	republic	President (Prezident)	Chairman of the Government (Předseda vlády)
Estonia	parliamentary	unitary	republic	President (President)	Head Minister (Peaminister)
Greece	parliamentary	unitary	republic	President (Πρόεδρος)	Prime Minister / President of the Government (Πρωθυπουργός / Πρόεδρος της Κυβερνήσεως)^{[I]}
Hungary	parliamentary	unitary	republic	President of the Republic (Köztársasági Elnök)	Minister-President (Miniszterelnök)
Ireland	parliamentary	unitary	republic	President (Uachtarán)	Leader (Taoiseach)^{[II]}
Latvia	parliamentary	unitary	republic	President (Prezidents)	Minister-President (Ministru prezidents)
Malta	parliamentary	unitary	republic	President (President)	Prime Minister (Prim Ministru)
Slovakia	parliamentary	unitary	republic	President (Prezident)	Chairman of the Government (Predseda vlády)
Slovenia	parliamentary	unitary	republic	President (Predsednik)	President of the Government (Predsednik vlade)
Luxembourg	parliamentary	unitary	constitutional monarchy	Grand Duke (Grand-duc / Großherzog / Groussherzog)	Prime Minister (Premier ministre / Premierminister / Premierminister)
Sweden	parliamentary	unitary	constitutional monarchy	King (Kung)	Minister of State (Statsminister)
Austria	parliamentary	federal	republic	Federal President (Bundespräsident)	Federal Chancellor (Bundeskanzler)
Germany	parliamentary	federal	republic	Federal President (Bundespräsident)	Federal Chancellor (Bundeskanzler)
Belgium	parliamentary	federal	constitutional popular monarchy	King (Koning / Roi / König)	Prime Minister / First Minister (Eerste Minister / Premier Ministre / Premierminister)
Finland	parliamentary	federate	republic	President (Presidentti / President)	Head Minister / Minister of State (Pääministeri / Statsminister)
Denmark	parliamentary	federate	constitutional monarchy	King (Konge)	Minister of State (Statsminister)
Netherlands	parliamentary	federate	constitutional monarchy	King (Koning)	Minister-President (Minister-president)
Italy	parliamentary	devolved	republic	President of the Republic (Presidente della Repubblica)	President of the Council of Ministers (Presidente del Consiglio dei Ministri)
Spain	parliamentary	devolved	constitutional monarchy	King (Rey)	President of the Government (Presidente del Gobierno)
France	semi-presidential	federate	republic	President (Président)	Prime Minister (Premier ministre)
Lithuania	semi-presidential	unitary	republic	President (Prezidentas)	Minister-Chairman (Ministras Pirmininkas)
Poland	semi-presidential	unitary	republic	President (Prezydent)	President of the Council of Ministers (Prezes Rady Ministrów)
Portugal	semi-presidential	unitary	republic	President (Presidente)	Prime Minister (Primeiro-Ministro)
Romania	semi-presidential	unitary	republic	President (Preşedinte)	Prime Minister (Prim-ministru)
Cyprus	presidential	unitary	republic	President (Πρόεδρος / Cumhurbaşkanı)	

I: While the Constitution of Greece refers to the office as "Prime Minister", "President of the Government" is used as an atlernative title.
II: The Irish name is used in the English-language version of the Constitution of Ireland, and generally in English-language speech and writing in Ireland.

== Listed by type of parliament ==
Member state	System	Overall name of legislature	
Member state	System	Lower house (members)	Upper house (members)
Austria	bicameral	Austrian Parliament (Österreichisches Parlament), convened jointly as Federal Assembly (Bundesversammlung)	
Austria	bicameral	National Council (Nationalrat) (183)	Federal Council (Bundesrat) (61)
Belgium	bicameral^{[I]}, de facto unicameral	Federal Parliament (Federaal Parlement / Parlement fédéral / Föderales Parlament), convened jointly as United Chambers (Verenigde Kamers / Chambres réunies)	
Belgium	bicameral^{[I]}, de facto unicameral	Chamber of Representatives (Kamer van Volksvertegenwoordigers / Chambre des Représentants / Abgeordnetenkammer) (150)	Senate (Senaat / Sénat / Senat) (60)
Bulgaria	unicameral	National Assembly (Народно събрание) (240)	
Croatia	unicameral	Croatian Parliament (Hrvatski sabor) (151)	
Cyprus	unicameral	House of Representatives (Βουλή των Αντιπροσώπων / Temsilciler Meclisi) (56)^{[II]}	
Czech Republic	bicameral	Parliament (Parlament)	
Czech Republic	bicameral	Chamber of Deputies (Poslanecká sněmovna) (200)	Senate (Senát) (81)
Denmark	unicameral	The People's Thing (Folketinget) (179)	
Estonia	unicameral	State Assembly (Riigikogu) (101)	
Finland	unicameral^{[III]}	Diet (Eduskunta / Riksdag) (200)	
France	bicameral	Parliament (Parlement), convened jointly as Congress (Congrès)	
France	bicameral	National Assembly (Assemblée nationale) (577)	Senate (Sénat) (348)
Germany	bicameral	—^{[IV]}	
Germany	bicameral	Federal Diet (Bundestag) (736)^{[V]}	Federal Council (Bundesrat) (69)
Greece	unicameral	Parliament of the Greeks (Βουλή των Ελλήνων) (300)	
Hungary	unicameral	National Assembly (Országgyűlés) (199)	
Ireland	bicameral	National Parliament (Oireachtas)^{[VI]}	
Ireland	bicameral	Assembly (Dáil)^{[VI]} (166)	Senate (Seanad)^{[VI]} (60)
Italy	bicameral	Parliament (Parlamento)	
Italy	bicameral	Chamber of Deputies (Camera dei Deputati) (400)	Senate of the Republic (Senato della Repubblica) (200)^{[VII]}
Latvia	unicameral	Diet (Saeima) (100)	
Lithuania	unicameral	Diet (Seimas) (141)	
Luxembourg	unicameral	Chamber of Deputies (Chambre des Députés / Abgeordnetenkammer / Châmber vun Députéirten) (60)	
Malta	unicameral	House of Representatives (Kamra tad-Deputati) (67)^{[VIII]}	
Netherlands	bicameral	States–General (Staten–Generaal)	
Netherlands	bicameral	Second Chamber (Tweede Kamer) (150)	First Chamber (Eerste Kamer) (75)
Poland	bicameral	National Assembly (Zgromadzenie Narodowe)^{[IX]}	
Poland	bicameral	Diet (Sejm) (460)	Senate (Senat) (100)
Portugal	unicameral	Assembly of the Republic (Assembleia da República) (230)	
Romania	bicameral	Parliament (Parlamentul), convened jointly as the Reunited Chambers (Camerele Reunite)	
Romania	bicameral	Chamber of Deputies (Camera Deputaţilor) (330)	Senate (Senat) (136)
Slovakia	unicameral	National Council (Národná rada) (150)	
Slovenia	bicameral	Parliament (Parlament)	
Slovenia	bicameral	National Assembly (Državni zbor) (90)	National Council (Državni svet) (40)
Spain	bicameral	General Courts (Cortes Generales)	
Spain	bicameral	Congress of Deputies (Congreso de los Diputados) (350)	Senate (Senado) (266)
Sweden	unicameral	Diet of the Realm (Riksdagen) (349)	

I: Due to Belgium's complex federal structure the Parliament of the Brussels-Capital Region (Brussels Hoofdstedelijk Parlement / Parlement de la Région de Bruxelles-Capitale) (89, regional assembly), Flemish Parliament (Vlaams Parlement) (124, regional and community assembly), the Walloon Parliament (Parlement wallon) (75, regional assembly), the Parliament of the French Community (Parlement de la Communauté française) (94, community assembly) and the Parliament of the German-speaking Community (Parlament der Deutschsprachigen Gemeinschaft) (25, community assembly) have competences in federal legislation that affects their interests.
II: Only 56 out of 80 are occupied, due to the occupation of Cyprus.
III: In legislation which affects the autonomous region of Åland, its Parliament (Lagting) (30) also has legislative competences.
IV: While there is a Federal Assembly (Bundesversammlung) similar to the Austrian Federal Assembly, it is not simply a joint session of the Federal Diet and the Federal Council and as such not the overall name of the legislature.
V: Technically, the Federal Diet only has 598 seats; the additional thirty-two members are overhang seats resulting from the 2017 election.
VI: The Irish names are used in the English-language version of the Constitution of Ireland, and generally in English-language speech and writing in Ireland.
VII: In addition to the 315 elected members, there are currently five senators for life (senatore a vita); these include former Italian President, who is ex officio senator for life, as well as senators appointed by the President "for outstanding patriotic merits in the social, scientific, artistic or literary field". There can only be five appointed senators in addition to the ex officio ones at any one time.
VIII: Technically, the House of Representatives only has 65 members; the additional two seats are overhang seats to ensure a majority of MPs for the party which gained the most votes in the 2017 election.
IX: The name Zgromadzenie Narodowe is only used on the rare occasions when both houses sit together.

== See also ==
- List of political systems in France
