= Autocracy =

Government where an individual holds absolute power

Autocracy is a form of government in which absolute power is held by one person, known as an autocrat. It includes both absolute monarchies and dictatorships, while it is contrasted with democracy and other forms of free government. The autocrat has total control over the exercise of civil liberties within the autocracy, choosing under what circumstances they may be exercised, if at all. Governments may also blend elements of autocracy and democracy, forming a mixed type of regime sometimes referred to as anocracy, hybrid regime, or electoral autocracy. The concept of autocracy has been recognized in political philosophy since ancient history.

Autocrats maintain power through political repression of any opposition and co-optation of other influential or powerful members of society. The general public is controlled through indoctrination and propaganda, and an autocracy may attempt to legitimize itself in the eyes of the public through appeals to political ideology, religion, birthright, or foreign hostility. Some autocracies establish legislatures, unfair elections, or show trials to further exercise control while presenting the appearance of democracy. The only limits to autocratic rule are practical considerations in preserving the regime. Autocrats must retain control over the nation's elites and institutions for their will to be exercised, but they must also prevent any other individual or group from gaining significant power or influence. Internal challenges are the most significant threats faced by autocrats, as they may lead to coups d'état.

Autocracy was among the earliest forms of government, and existed throughout the ancient world in various societies. Monarchy was the predominant form of autocracy for most of history. Dictatorship became more common in the 19th century, beginning with the caudillos in Latin America and the empires of Napoleon I and Napoleon III in Europe. Totalitarian dictatorships developed in the 20th century with the advent of fascist and communist states.

== Etymology and use ==
Autocracy comes from the Ancient Greek auto (Greek: αὐτός; "self") and kratos (Greek: κράτος; "power, might"). This became the Hellenistic/Byzantine Greek word autocrator (Greek: αὐτοκράτωρ) and the Latin imperator, both of which were titles for the Roman emperor. This was adopted in Old Russian as samod′rž′c′ and then modern Russian as samoderžec. In the 18th century, the title for the Russian emperor was translated to authocrateur and then autocrateur in French, while it was translated to Autocrator and then Autokrator, Selbstherrscher or Alleinherrscher in German. These terms were eventually used to refer to autocratic rulers in general. The term has since developed a negative connotation.

== Political structure ==
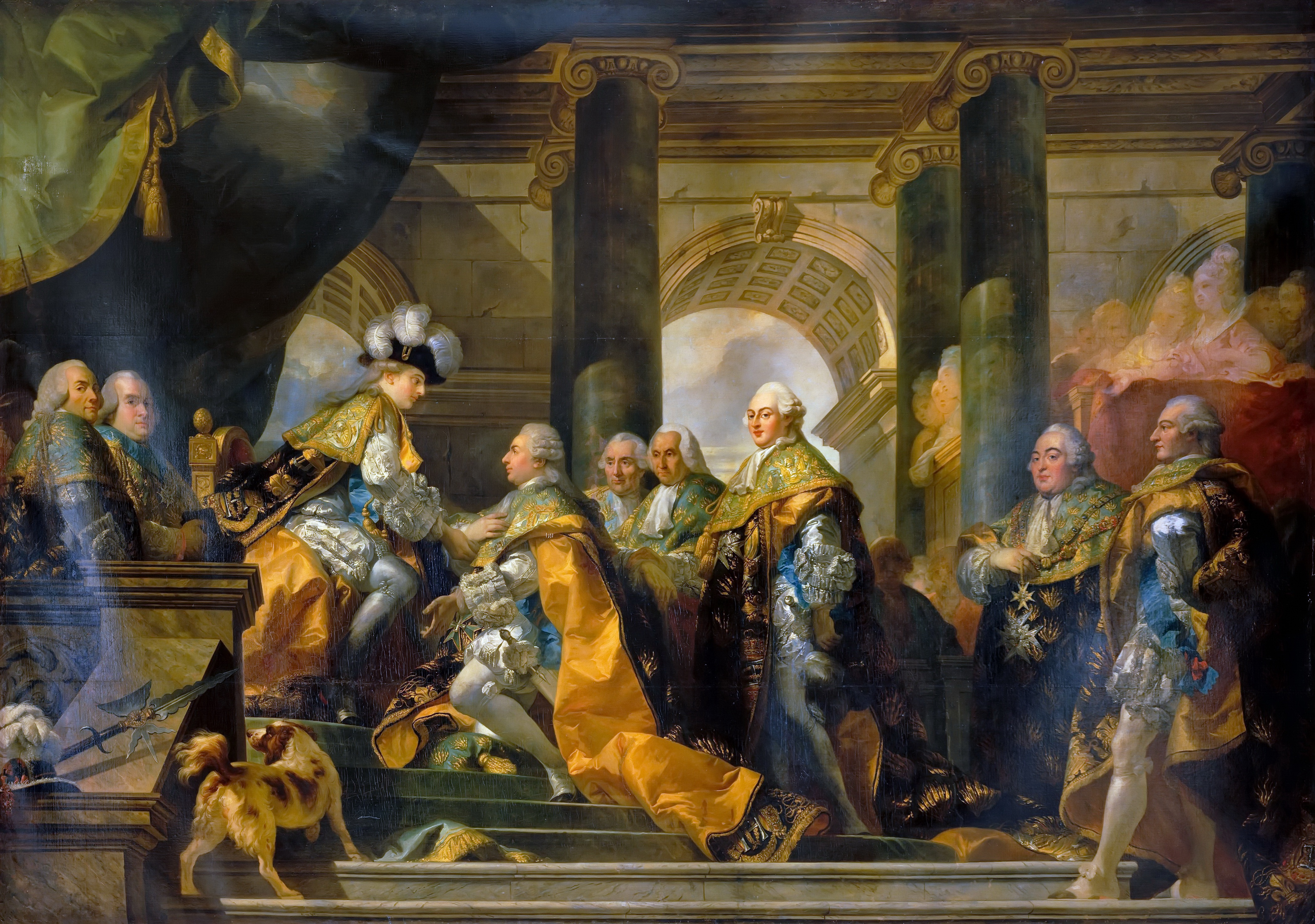
The coronation of Louis XVI of France (Gabriel François Doyen, 1775)

Many attempts have been made to define the political structure of autocracy. It traditionally entails a single unrestrained ruler, known as an autocrat, though unrestrained non-democratic rule by a group may also be defined as autocratic. Autocracy is distinguished from other forms of government by the power of the autocrat to unilaterally repress the civil liberties of the people and to choose what liberties they may exercise. Modern autocracy is often defined as any non-democratic government. As with all forms of government, autocracy has no clearly defined boundaries, and it may intersect with other forms of government. Though autocracy usually encompasses an entire country, it can sometimes take place at subnational or local levels, even in countries with a more democratic government, if the national government has limited control over a specific area or its political conflicts.

Autocracies impose few to no limits on the power of the autocrat, and any formal institutions that exist create only limited accountability. To maintain power, an autocrat must have the support of elites that hold influence in the country and assist the autocrat in carrying out their will. The amount of direct control that an autocrat wields in practice may vary. As an autocratic government solidifies its rule, it develops stronger institutions to carry out the autocrat's will. These institutions are necessary for maintaining control and extracting value from the state, but they can also serve as checks on the autocrat. Autocrats must also balance the affiliation that regional elites have over their jurisdiction; too little can prevent effective rule, while too much may cause the elite to favor the region's interests over the autocrat's. Some autocracies incorporate an elected legislature that has a limited ability to check the power of the autocrat, though these are not usually formed through free and fair elections. These legislatures may also be prone to corruption and can be influenced by the autocrat in exchange for preferential treatment. Other institutions, such as an independent judiciary or an active civil society, may also limit the autocrat's power.

Some autocracies emphasize a ruling family rather than a single autocrat. This has been the case of most monarchies. Such arrangements allow for royal intermarriage, which can join autocracies together through dynastic unions. Personalist dictatorships may also give significance to the ruling family through a cult of personality, such as the Kim family of North Korea and the Taliban of Afghanistan.

== Origin and development ==
=== Formation ===
The earliest autocracies, such as chiefdoms, formed where there was previously no centralized government. The initial development of an autocracy is attributed to its efficiency over anarchy, as it provides security and negates internal divisions. Mancur Olson introduced the term "stationary bandits" to describe the method of control associated with autocracy, as opposed to the "roaming bandits" that dominate anarchic society. Under this definition, autocrats as stationary bandits see long-term investment in the society that they exploit through taxation and other seizure of resources, as opposed to the bandits in stateless societies that have no incentive to improve society. This creates a Pareto efficiency in which both the autocrat and the subjects benefit over the alternative.

Douglass North, John Joseph Wallis, and Barry R. Weingast describe autocracies as natural states that arise from this need to monopolize violence. In contrast to Olson, these scholars understand the early state not as a single ruler, but as an organization formed by many actors. They describe the process of autocratic state formation as a bargaining process among individuals with access to violence. For them, these individuals form a dominant coalition that grants each other privileges such as the access to resources. As violence reduces the economic rents, members of the dominant coalition have incentives to cooperate and to avoid fighting. A limited access to privileges is necessary to avoid competition among the members of the dominant coalition, who then will credibly commit to cooperate and will form the state.

There is great variance in the types of states that become autocratic. Neither a state's size, its military strength, its economic success, nor its cultural attributes significantly affect whether it is likely to be autocratic. Autocracy is more likely to form in heterogeneous populations, as there is greater inequality and less social cohesion. Autocracies formed under these conditions are often more volatile for the same reasons.

=== Stability and succession ===
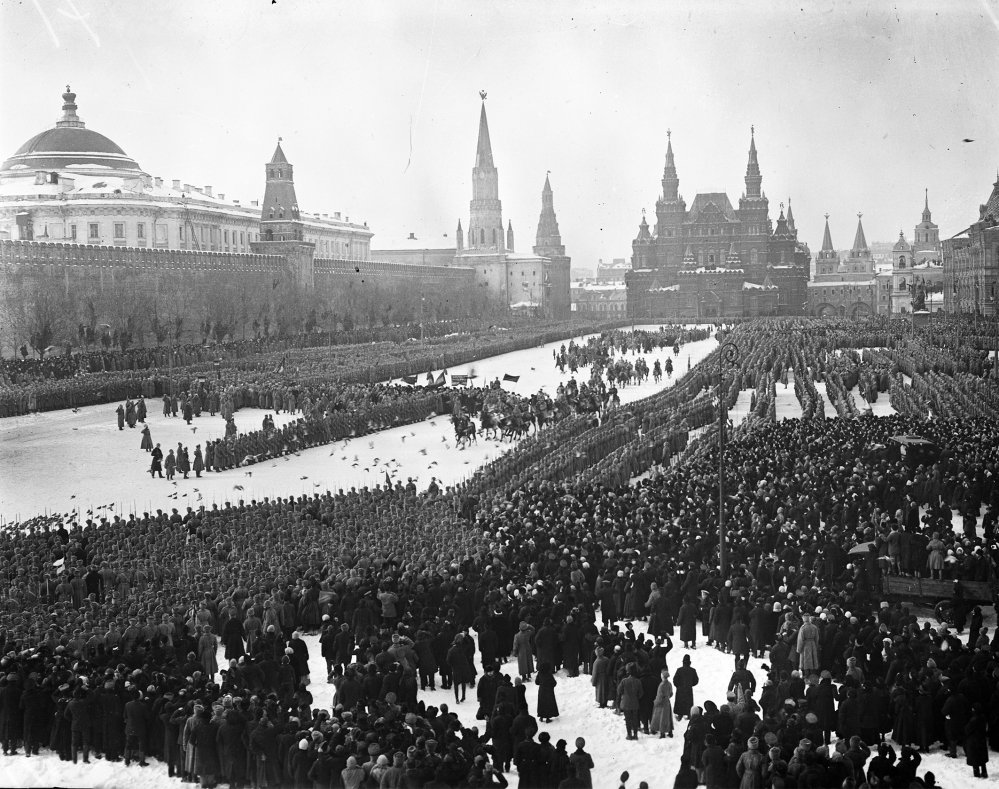
The Russian Revolution led to the replacement of the autocratic Russian Empire with the autocratic Soviet Union.

Autocracies face challenges to their authority from several fronts, including the citizenry, political opposition, and internal disloyalty from elites. As autocrats must share their power with the state's elites to see their will carried out, these elites are the greatest threat to the autocrat. Most autocratic governments are overthrown by a coup, and historically most have been succeeded by another autocratic government, though a trend toward democracy developed in 20th-century Europe. These new governments are commonly a different type of autocracy or a weaker variant of the same type. Autocracies that take power during revolutions tend to be exceptionally durable and long-lasting. They tend to face contestation such as coups and large-scale protests at a smaller rate compared to nonrevolutionary autocracies, and have more tools to thwart them when such threats emerge. Revolutionary autocracies have cohesive elite structures that minimize the chances of defections and tend to stay loyal during times of turmoil. They have strong coercive institutions, including loyal militaries that protect the ruling regime's status. Revolutionary autocracies also tend to lack independent centers of power that allow for opposition. Bad performances economically may prompt autocratic rulers to increase political repression to prevent regime change. Political spin doctoring and heavy reliance on information control instead of overt violence is a common feature among modern autocracies.

While popular support for revolution is often necessary to overthrow an autocratic government, most revolts are accompanied by internal support from elites who believe that it is no longer in their interest to support the autocrat. Overthrow of an autocratic government purely through popular revolt is virtually nonexistent throughout history, but popular support for democracy is a significant indicator of challenges to autocratic rule. Modernization and increased wealth are often associated with stronger support for democracy, though failing to provide these things also reduces support for the autocratic regime. Popular revolt is most likely to occur during periods of reform. Government reform can provide an impetus for stronger opposition, especially when it does not meet expectations, and it can weaken the centralization of power through poor implementation. When revolt appears likely, an autocrat may grant civil rights, redistribute wealth, or abdicate from power entirely to avoid the threat of violence.

Some autocracies use hereditary succession in which a set of rules determines who will be the next autocrat. Otherwise, a successor may be handpicked, either by the autocrat or by another governmental body. Pre-determined successors are incentivized to overthrow and replace the autocrat, creating a dilemma for autocrats wishing to choose a successor. The threat of overthrow is greater for appointed successors over hereditary successors, as hereditary successors are often younger and less influential. Other autocracies have no appointed successor, and a power struggle will take place upon the death or removal of the autocrat. These methods of succession are a common distinction between monarchical rule and dictatorial rule; monarchies use an established system of succession such as hereditary succession, while dictatorships do not. Autocratic rule is most unstable during succession from one autocrat to another. Orders of succession allow for more peaceful transition of power, but it prevents meaningful vetting of successors for competence or fortitude. When rule passes between autocrats, the incoming autocrat often inherits an established bureaucracy. This bureaucracy facilitates the transfer of power, as the new ruler gains immediate control over the nation without having to conquer its people or win their popular support.

=== Legitimacy ===
Autocrats may claim that they have legitimacy under a legal framework, or they may exert influence purely through force. Opinion on whether an autocratic government is legitimate can vary, even among its own population. An autocracy's approach to legitimacy can be affected by recognition from other nations. Widely accepted autocratic governments are more able to convince their own populations of their legitimacy. Less widely accepted autocracies may rally internal support by attributing their lack of recognition to malevolent foreign efforts, such as American imperialism or Zionism.

Historically, the most common claim of legitimacy is birthright in an autocracy that uses hereditary succession. Theocratic governments appeal to religion to justify their rule, arguing that religious leaders must also be political leaders. Other autocrats may use similar claims of divine authority to justify their rule, often in absolute monarchy. This includes the Mandate of Heaven in ancient China and the divine right of kings in 17th-century England and France. When an autocratic government has a state ideology, this may be used to justify the autocrat's rule. This is most common in communist or ethnonationalist governments. Autocracies with unfair elections will cite election results to prove that the autocrat has a mandate to rule. Some autocracies will use practical considerations to legitimise their rule, arguing that they are necessary to provide basic needs to the population.

== Types ==
Monarchies were common in medieval Europe, but in the modern era dictatorship is the most common form of autocracy globally.

Autocratic governments are classified as totalitarian when they engage in direct control of citizens' lives, or as authoritarian when they do not. Totalitarian governments do not allow political or cultural pluralism. Instead, citizens are expected to devote themselves to a single ideological vision and demonstrate their support of the state ideology through political engagement. Totalitarian governments are revolutionary, seeking radically to reform society, and they often engage in terror against groups that do not comply with the state's vision. Totalitarianism is associated with communist states and Nazi Germany. Authoritarian governments maintain control of a nation purely through repression and controlled opposition rather than mandated adherence to a state ideology. These include most traditional monarchies, military dictatorships, dominant party states and theocracies.

An absolute autocracy may be referred to as despotism, in which the autocrat rules purely through personal control without any meaningful institutions. These were most common in pre-industrial societies, when large bureaucracies had not yet become standard in government. Sultanism is a type of personalist dictatorship in which a ruling family directly integrates itself into the state through a cult of personality, where it maintains control purely through rewards for allies and force against enemies. In these regimes, there is no guiding ideology or legal system, and the state serves only to bring about the leader's own personal enrichment. Other descriptors, such as tyranny and absolutism, may also be associated with variations of autocracy.

Though autocracies often restrict civil and political rights, some may allow limited exercise of some rights. These autocracies grant moderate representation to political opponents and allow exercise of some civil rights, though less than those associated with democracy. These are contrasted with closed autocracies, which do not permit the exercise of these rights. Several forms of semi-autocratic government have been defined in which governments blend elements of democracy and autocracy. These include limited autocracy, semi-autocracy, liberal autocracy, semi-liberal autocracy, anocracy, electoral autocracy, partly free regimes and multi-party autocracies. These governments may begin as democratic governments and then become autocratic as the elected leader seizes control over the nation's institutions and electoral process. Conversely, autocratic governments may transition to democracy through a period of semi-autocratic rule.

== History ==
=== Early history ===
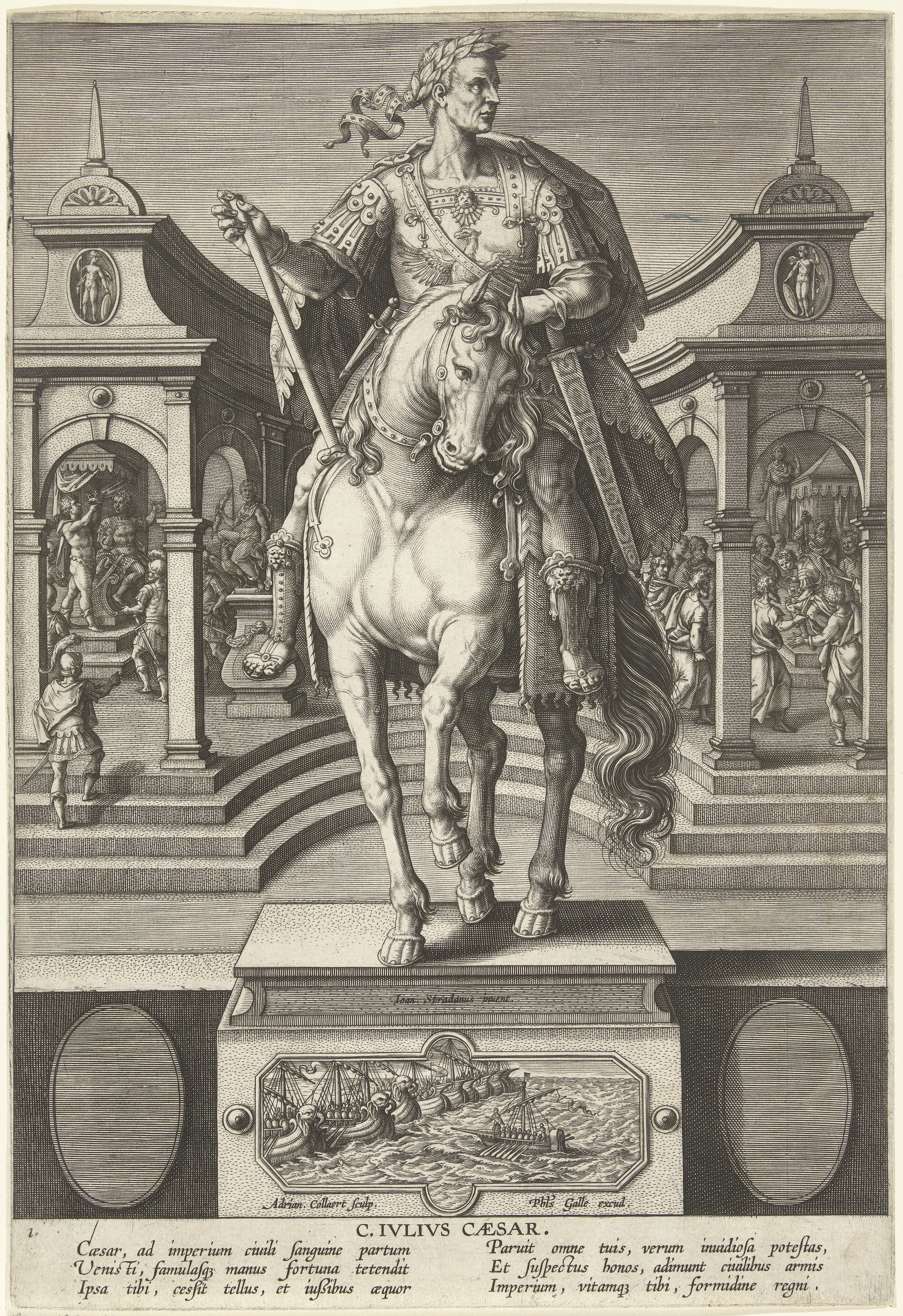
Julius Caesar (engraved c. 1587 – c. 1589)

Autocracy has been the primary form of government for most of human history. One of the earliest forms of government was the chiefdom that developed in tribal societies, which date back to the Neolithic. Chiefdoms are regional collections of villages ruled over by tribal chief. They are an emergent form of governance, originating from societies that previously lacked a centralized authority. Historical chiefs often held only tenuous power over the chiefdom, but they trended towards autocracy as heterarchical governance was replaced with hierarchical governance.

Early states were formed by warlords ruling over conquered territory. The first states were the city-states of Mesopotamia, which first developed around the 35th century BC. These early states were ruled by kings who were both political and religious leaders. These were followed by the first empire, the Akkadian Empire, when they were conquered by Sargon of Akkad in the 24th century BC. The blending of autocratic rule with religious significance continued under the Akkadian Empire, as the king Naram-Sin of Akkad was the first of several kings to be recognized as a god over the following centuries. Ancient Egypt also existed as an autocratic government for most of its early history, first developing states at the end of the fourth millennium BC.

China has been subject to autocratic rule almost without interruption since its ancient feudal society was replaced by the Qin dynasty in 221 BC, and even its feudal government had stronger elements of autocracy than other instances of feudalism. The early Chinese philosophy of Confucianism emphasized the importance of benevolent autocratic rule to maintain order, and this philosophy heavily influenced future Chinese thought.

City-states in Ancient Greece and the Etruscan civilization were often ruled by tyrants, individuals who seized absolute political authority without constitutional right. The Roman Republic introduced the concept of the Roman dictator who would be temporarily invested with unchecked power to restore stability during periods of crisis. This temporary dictatorship was eventually subverted by Julius Caesar when he became dictator for life in 44 BC, ending the Roman Republic and ushering the creation of the autocratic Roman Empire.

Several early military autocracies formed in East Asia during the post-classical era. These include the rule of the Goguryeo kingdom by Yŏn Kaesomun in 642, the Goryeo military regime beginning in 1170, and the shogunate in Japan between the 12th and 19th centuries.

Parliamentary monarchies became common in the 13th century as monarchs sought larger advising bodies that were representative of the kingdom. European nations moved away from feudalism and towards centralized monarchy as the primary form of government in the 14th century.

=== Modern era ===
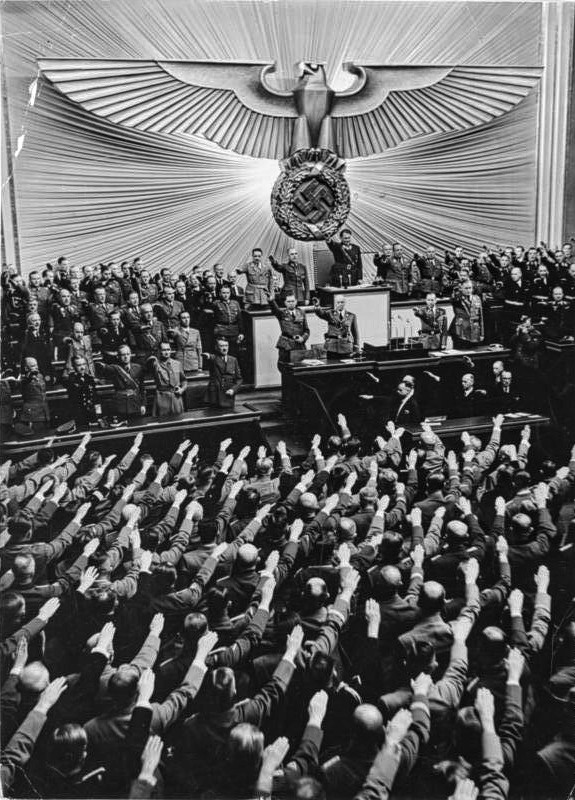
Members of the Nazi Party salute Adolf Hitler in 1940.

Absolutism became more common in European monarchies at the onset of the 16th century as the continent struggled with weak leadership and religious conflict. Legislatures during this period were often tailored to enforce the king's will but not challenge it. This was sometimes justified through the divine right of kings, particularly in the kingdoms of England and France.

The French Revolution marked a significant shift in the perception of dictatorship as a form of tyrannical rule, as revolutionaries justified their actions as a means of combatting tyranny. In Europe, the original forms of dictatorship were Bonapartism, a form of monarchism that rejected feudalism, and Caesarism, imperial rule reminiscent of Julius Caesar. These were primarily used to define the First and Second French Empires. European monarchies moved away from autocracy in the 19th century as legislatures increased in power. In 19th-century Latin America, regional rulers known as caudillos seized power in several nations as early examples of dictators.

The 19th and 20th centuries brought about the decline of traditional monarchies in favor of modern states, many of which developed as autocracies. The upheaval caused by World War I resulted in a broad shift of governance across Europe, and many nations moved away from traditional monarchies. Most European monarchs were stripped of their powers to become constitutional monarchs, or they were displaced entirely in favor of republics. Totalitarianism first developed as a form of autocracy during the interwar period. It seized power in many of these republics, particularly during the Great Depression. This saw the establishment of fascist, communist, and military dictatorships throughout Europe.

The communist state first developed as a new form of autocracy following the Russian Revolution. This type of autocratic government enforced totalitarian control over its citizens through a mass party said to represent the citizens. While other forms of European dictatorship were dissolved after World War II, communism was strengthened and became the basis of several dictatorships in Eastern Europe. Communist states became the primary model for autocratic government in the late 20th century, and many non-communist autocratic regimes replicated the communist style of government.

The decline in autocracy across Western Europe affected autocratic government elsewhere in the world through colonization. Societies without a state were readily colonized by European nations and subsequently adopted democracy and parliamentary government after it became common in Europe. Regions with historically strong autocratic states were able to resist European colonization or otherwise went unchanged, allowing autocracy to be preserved.

The strength of autocracy in global politics was significantly reduced at the end of the Cold War with the dissolution of the Soviet Union in 1991, but it saw a resurgence over the following decades through regional powers such as China, Iran, Russia, and Saudi Arabia. The fall of totalitarian regimes led to authoritarianism becoming the predominant form of autocracy in the 21st century.

== Political activity ==
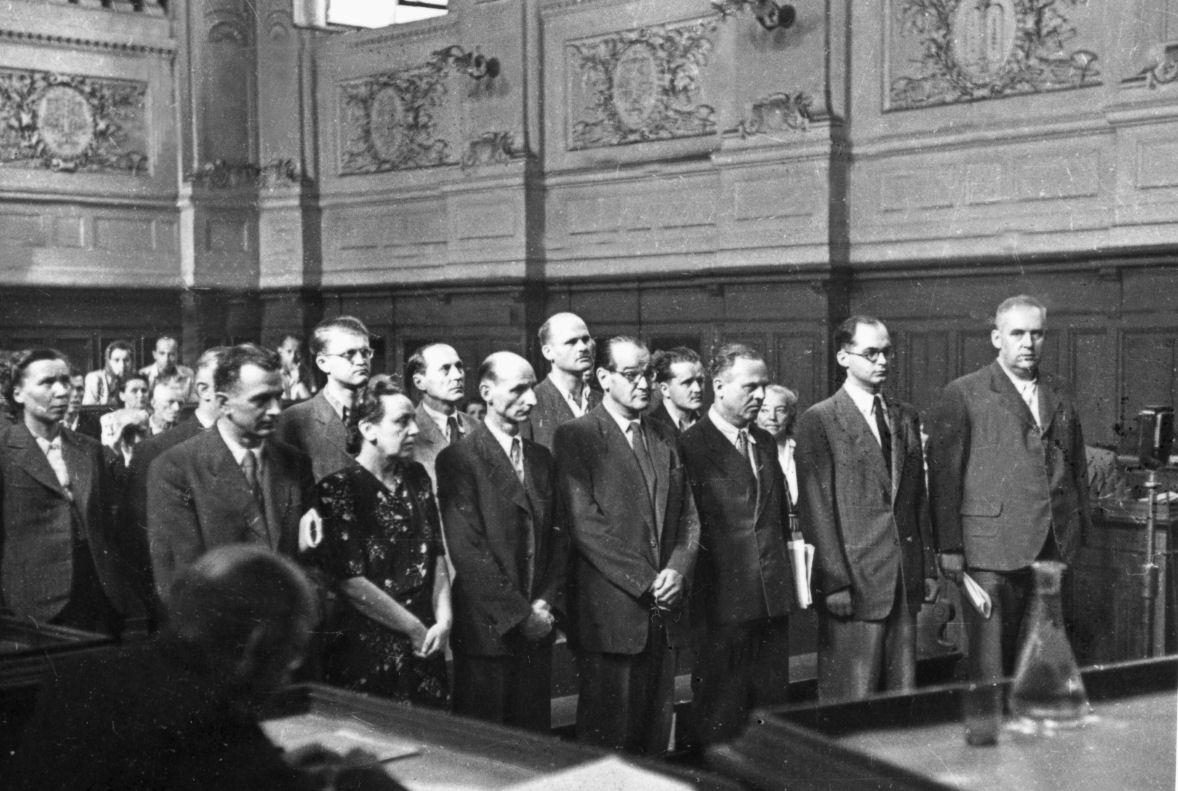
The Nagode Trial, a 1947 show trial in Slovenia

Political repression is the primary method by which autocrats preserve the regime and prevent the loss of power. This repression may take place implicitly by coercing and intimidating potential opposition, or it may involve direct violence. Autocratic governments also engage in co-optation, in which influential figures are provided benefits by the regime in exchange for their support. Coercing these elites is usually more efficient for the autocrat than intimidating them through violence. Political parties are a common method of co-optation and coercion, as they provide a mechanism to control members of the government, initiate new members, and discourage a military coup. Autocratic governments controlled through a political party last longer on average than other autocratic governments.

Control over the public is maintained through indoctrination and propaganda. Autocratic governments enjoy similar levels of public support to democratic governments, and a state's status as autocratic is not a significant indicator in whether it is supported by its citizens. Autocrats often appeal to the people by supporting a specific political, ethnic, or religious movement.

The different forms of autocratic government create significant variance in their foreign policy. Overall, autocratic governments are more likely to go to war than democratic governments, as citizens are not part of the selectorate to which autocrats are accountable. Totalitarian autocracies have historically engaged in militarism and expansionism after consolidating power, particularly fascist governments. This allows the autocracy to spread its state ideology, and the existence of foreign adversaries allows the autocrat to rally internal support.

Most autocratic regimes in the 21st century have departed from the historical precedent of direct rule in favor of institutions that resemble those of democratic governments. This may include controlled liberties for citizens such as the formation of opposition parties to participate in unfair elections. Elections provide several benefits to autocratic regimes, allowing for a venue to restrain or appease the opposition and creating a method to transfer power without violent conflict. Many autocrats also institute show trials to carry out political repression rather than carrying out direct purges. This may be done to more publicly discourage future dissidents. Prior to this trend, autocratic elections rarely invited public participation. They were instead used by elites to choose a leader amongst themselves, such as in an electoral monarchy. The creation of a constitution is another common measure used by autocrats to stay in power; as they are able to draft the constitution unilaterally, it can be tailored to suit their rule.

== Study and evaluation ==
The 2026 V-Dem Electoral Democracy Index. More autocratic regimes are designated in dark orange and red

V-Dem Regimes of the World, 2026 Liberal Democracy Electoral Democracy Democratic Grey Zone Autocratic Grey Zone Electoral Autocracy Closed Autocracy

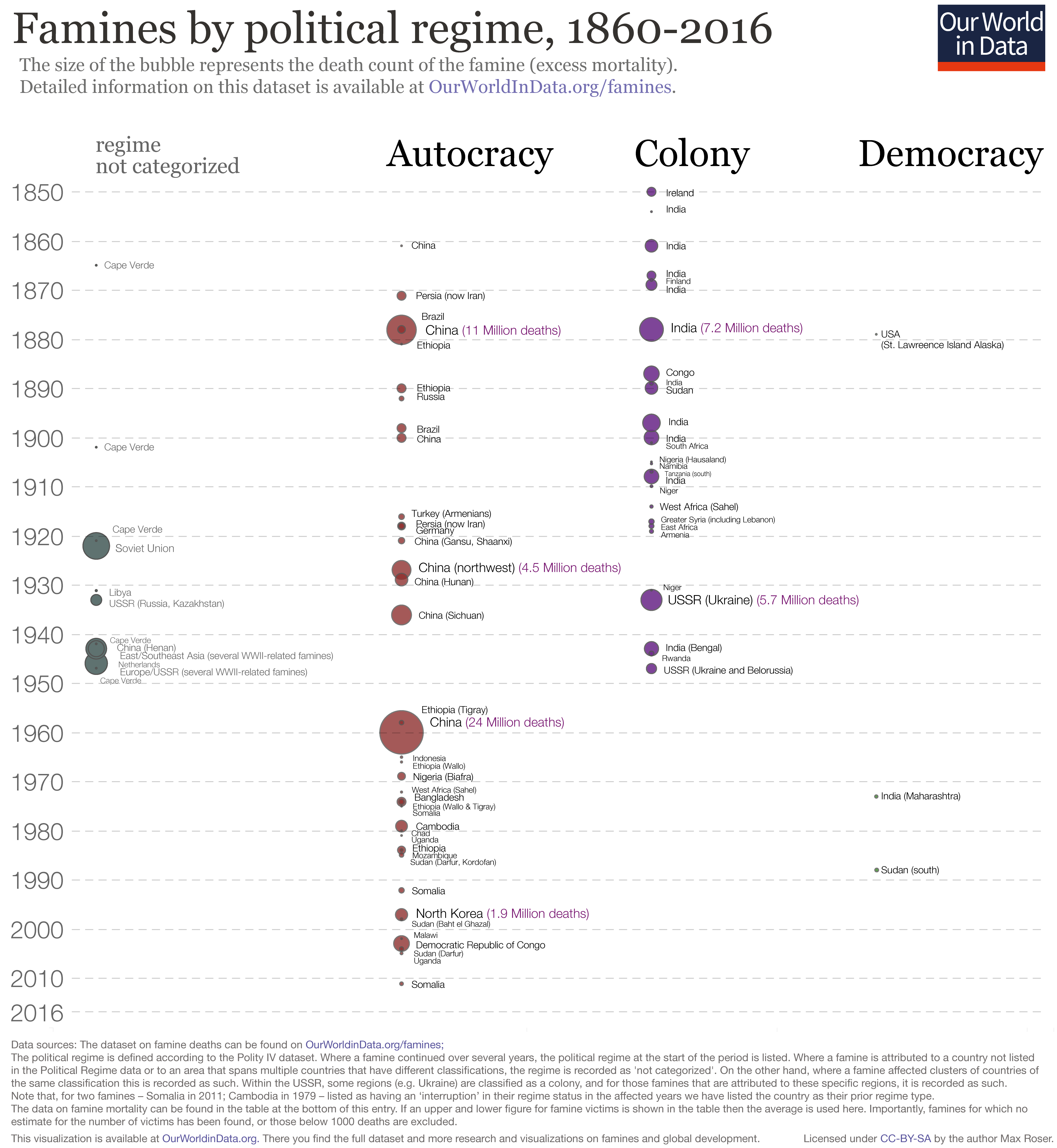
Famines since 1850 by political regime. Autocratic countries have experienced significantly more famines than democratic countries.

Autocratic government has been central to political theory since the development of Ancient Greek political philosophy. Despite its historical prominence, autocracy has not been widely recognized as its own political theory in the way that democracy has. Autocratic government is generally considered to be less desirable than democratic government. Reasons for this include its proclivity for corruption and violence as well as its lack of efficiency and its weakness in promoting liberty and transparency.

Historically, data on the operation of autocratic government has been limited, preventing detailed study. Study of postcolonial autocracy in Africa has been particularly limited, as these governments were less likely to keep detailed records of their activities relative to other governments at the time, and they frequently destroyed the records that did exist. Study of citizen support for autocratic government relative to democratic government has also been infrequent, and most studies conducted in this area have been limited to East Asia. Collection of information on autocratic regimes has improved in the 21st century, allowing for more detailed analysis.

Autocratic government has been found to have effects on a country's politics, including its government's structure and bureaucracy, long after it democratizes. Comparisons between regions have found disparities in citizen attitudes, policy preferences, and political engagement depending on whether it had been subject to autocracy, even in different regions within the same country. Citizens of postcommunist nations are more likely to distrust government and free markets, directly hindering the long-term economic prosperity of these nations. Xenophobia is generally more common in post-autocratic nations, and voters in these nations are more likely to vote for far-right or far-left political parties.

Many democracy indices have been developed to measure how democratic or authoritarian countries are, such as the Polity data series, the Freedom in the World report, and the Varieties of Democracy indices. These indices measure various attributes of a government's actions and its citizens' rights to sort democracies and autocracies. These attributes might include enfranchisement, freedom of expression, freedom of information, separation of powers, or free and fair elections, among others. Both the choice in attributes and the method of measuring them are subjective, and they are defined individually be each index. Despite this, different democracy indices generally produce similar results. Most discrepancies come from the measurement governments that blend democratic and autocratic traits. Different democracy indices refer to such types of government using a range of different names, for example, hybrid regimes, anocracies, partly free regimes or electoral autocracies, and use different definitions and indicators to distinguish them from full autocracies and democracies.

The concepts of tyranny and despotism as distinct modes of government were abandoned in the 19th century in favor of more specific typologies. Modern typology of autocratic regimes originates from the work of Juan Linz in the mid-20th century, when his division of democracy, authoritarianism, and totalitarianism became accepted. The first general theory of autocracy that defined it independently of other systems was created by Gordon Tullock in 1974 through applied public choice theory. At the end of the Cold War, Francis Fukuyama's theory of the end of history became popular among political scientists. This theory proposed that autocratic government was approaching a permanent decline to be replaced by liberal democracy. This theory was largely abandoned after the increase in autocratic government over the following decades. In the 2010s, the concept of "autocracy promotion" became influential in the study of autocracy, proposing that some governments have sought to establish autocratic rule in foreign nations, though subsequent studies have found little evidence to support that such efforts are as widespread or successful as originally thought.

== See also ==
- Centralisation
- Democratic backsliding
- Kakistocracy
- Kleptocracy
- Mafia state
- Monocracy
- Oligarchy
- Patrimonialism
- Rule of man
- Statism
- Triumvirate
- Tsarist autocracy
