= Political structure =

Institutions and relations to each other in political science

Political structure is a commonly used term in political science. In a general sense, it refers to institutions or even groups and their relations to each other, their patterns of interaction within political systems and to political regulations, laws and the norms present in political systems in such a way that they constitute the political landscape and the political entity. In the social domain, its counterpart is social structure. Political structure also refers to the way in which a government is run. Political structure refers to how the governmental system of a country is arranged.
