= Guided democracy =

Democratic governments acting as autocracies

Guided democracy, also called directed democracy and managed democracy, is a term used for some hybrid regimes that were or are formally democratic governments that function as de facto authoritarian governments. Guided democracies are legitimized by elections, but these elections do not change the state's policies, motives, and goals. In a guided democracy, the government controls elections so that citizens appear to exercise democratic rights without truly changing public policy. The state's continuous use of propaganda techniques prevents the electorate from having a significant impact on policy.

The term "guided democracy" was used by Pakistani president Ayub Khan in the 1960s, by historians to refer to the Sanation regime of Poland from 1926 to 1939, and was an official name for Indonesian democracy under the Sukarno presidency in the early 1960s.

== Examples ==
=== Poland under Sanation ===
The Sanation regime that governed interwar Poland from 1926 to 1939 is considered an example of guided democracy, during both its first phase from 1926 to 1930, as well as the final 1930–1939 phase. The regime retained much of the structures and institutions of Polish parliamentary democracy, even though Józef Piłsudski exercised such large influence on the government that he "assumed some of the postures of a dictator". The 1935 April Constitution of Poland implemented by Sanacja centralized most state power in the hands of President, but the Polish guided democracy nevertheless stayed pluralistic, even if authoritarian. The opposition sat in the parliament and local governments, and political parties were allowed to function legally.

Polish historian Andrzej Chojnowski notes that elections under Piłsudski's regime were still organised along the principles of parliamentary democracy, and the Sanacja regime was genuinely popular as the opposition parties were blamed for failing to prevent the Great Depression. Writing about late Sanacja, Antony Polonsky stated that even after 1930, "parties survived, the press was fairly free, criticism was allowed", thus maintaining the system of guided democracy. While the actions of the opposition were hampered, repressions were rare and only two parties were banned: Camp of Great Poland and National Radical Camp.

=== Indonesia under Sukarno ===
After World War II, the term "guided democracy" was used in Indonesia for the approach to government under the Sukarno administration from 1959 to 1966.

=== Russia under Putin ===
The term "managed democracy" has been used to describe the political system of Russia under Vladimir Putin by former Putin advisor Gleb Pavlovsky, by media, and by Russian intellectual Marat Gelman.

== See also ==
- Conservative democracy – Turkish political term to describe Islamic democracy
- Corporatocracy – Society controlled by business corporations
- Defensive democracy – Prevention of anti-democratic principles
- Dictablanda – Dictatorship in which civil liberties are allegedly preserved
- Dominant-party system – Continuous dominance of a single political party in elections
- Enlightened absolutism – Political philosophy
- Ethnic democracy – Alleged form of democratic government
- Herrenvolk democracy – Form of government in which only one ethnic group can vote
- Liberal autocracy – Form of non-democratic government
- Illiberal democracy – System of governance
- Sovereign democracy – Term describing modern Russian politics
- Totalitarian democracy – Dictatorship based on the mass enthusiasm generated by a perfectionist ideology
- Types of democracy
- Helldivers 2 – 2024 video game which involves spreading managed democracy
