= Electoral autocracy =

Hybrid regime with regular but unfair elections

Electoral autocracy is a hybrid regime, in which democratic institutions are imitative and adhere to authoritarian methods. In these regimes, regular elections are held, but they are accused of failing to reach democratic standards of freedom and fairness. However, while most researchers agree on this broad definition of electoral autocracy, there is substantial variation with regard to how researchers define and measure this type of regime. As a consequence, whether or not countries are classified as electoral autocracies is highly contingent on the specific definitions and measures applied.

According to a 2018 study, most party-led dictatorships regularly hold popular elections. Prior to the 1990s, most of these elections had no alternative parties or candidates for voters to choose. Since the end of the Cold War, about two-thirds of elections in authoritarian systems allow for some opposition, but the elections are structured in a way to heavily favor the incumbent authoritarian regime. In 2020, almost half of all authoritarian systems had multi-party governments. Cabinet appointments by an authoritarian regime to outsiders can consolidate their rule by dividing the opposition and co-opting outsiders.

Hindrances to free and fair elections in authoritarian systems may include:

- Control of the media by the authoritarian incumbents.
- Interference with opposition campaigning.
- Electoral fraud.
- Violence against opposition.
- Large-scale spending by the state in favor of the incumbents.
- Permitting of some parties, but not others.
- Prohibitions on opposition parties, but not independent candidates.
- Allowing competition between candidates within the incumbent party, but not those who are not in the incumbent party.

== Comparison to democracies and authoritarian states ==
Democratic and authoritarian arguably differ most prominently in their elections. Democratic elections are generally inclusive, competitive, and fair. In most instances, the elected leader is appointed to act on behalf of the general will. Authoritarian elections, on the other hand, are frequently subject to fraud and extreme constraints on the participation of opposing parties. Autocratic leaders employ tactics like murdering political opposition and paying election monitors to ensure victory. The proportion of authoritarian regimes with elections and support parties has risen in recent years. This is largely due to the increasing popularity of democracies and electoral autocracies, leading authoritarian regimes to imitate democratic regimes in hopes of receiving foreign aid and dodging criticism. Flawed elections also give authoritarians a controlled way to monitor public sentiment.

Competitive authoritarian regimes differ from fully authoritarian regimes in that elections are regularly held, the opposition can openly operate without a high risk of exile or imprisonment and "democratic procedures are sufficiently meaningful for opposition groups to take them seriously as arenas through which to contest for power." Competitive authoritarian regimes lack one or more of the three characteristics of democracies such as free elections (i.e. elections untainted by substantial fraud or voter intimidation); protection of civil liberties (i.e. the freedom of speech, press and association) and an even playing field (in terms of access to resources, the media and legal recourse).

== Electoral autocracies around the world ==
V-Dem Regimes of the World, 2026 Liberal Democracy Electoral Democracy Democratic Grey Zone Autocratic Grey Zone Electoral Autocracy Closed Autocracy

=== Hungary under Orbán government ===
In September 2022 the European Parliament passed a resolution that due to "a breakdown in democracy, the rule of law and fundamental rights in Hungary" the country turned into "a hybrid regime of electoral autocracy".

=== India under Modi government ===
In 2021, the Swedish political research institute Varieties of Democracy (V-Dem) lowered India's ranking from flawed democracy to electoral autocracy, citing alleged increasing nationalist rhetoric and diminishing freedom of expression under the government of Bharatiya Janata Party (BJP) and its Prime Minister Narendra Modi. United States–based Freedom House also lowered Indian democracy ranking from free democracy to a "partially free democracy". In the same year, Institute for Democracy and Electoral Assistance classified India as a backsliding democracy, citing similar reasons. According to The Guardian, the Indian government dismissed the reports, saying self-appointed people cannot be custodian of democracy for India, but expressing concern about the reputational damage caused by the changing designations.

== See also ==
- Authoritarian democracy
- Elective dictatorship
- Democratic backsliding
- Embedded democracy
- Illiberal democracy
- Semi-democracy
- Inverted totalitarianism
