= Liberal autocracy =

Form of non-democratic government

A liberal autocracy is a non-democratic government that follows the principles of liberalism. Until the 20th century, most countries in Western Europe were "liberal autocracies, or at best, semi-democracies". One example of a "classic liberal autocracy" was the Austro-Hungarian Empire. According to Fareed Zakaria, a more recent example was British Hong Kong. He observed that until 1991, the British who had ruled Hong Kong since 1841 "had never held a meaningful election, but its government epitomized constitutional liberalism, protecting its citizens' basic rights (especially after World War II) and administering a relatively fair judiciary and bureaucracy". The term is also used to describe 19th and early 20th century constitutional monarchies that while had constitutional protection of liberties, also lacked wide democratic participation.

== Overview ==
The existence of real liberties in many of these autocracies is questionable. For instance, 19th-century autocracies often abolished feudal institutions like serfdom, guilds, privileges for the nobility and inequality before the law, but freedom of speech and freedom of association were at best limited. As such, liberal autocracy often preceded various forms of electoral democracy in the evolution of these nations, being much more open than feudal monarchies but less free than modern liberal democracies.

Hong Kong is often regarded as a special case, where in the later years of British colonial rule before the handover, there was considerable freedom of speech and freedom of association. However, it was widely recognised, including by the British, that China would not allow part of its territory to sustain these freedoms or to hold completely free elections even if it retained autonomy as a special administrative region (SAR). It was also suggested that since 2005 and prior to the consequences of the Arab Spring, Egypt had been leaning towards a liberal autocracy.

Political system of Pahlavi Iran (particularly during the reign of Mohammad Reza Pahlavi) is also considered an example of liberal autocracy; the regime held back political participation and civil society while implementing cultural liberal policies, including the promotion of women's rights and secularization.

== See also ==
- Authoritarian capitalism
- Autocracy
- Enlightened absolutism
- Hybrid regime
- Illiberal democracy
- Liberal democracy
- Pahlavism
- Political liberalism
