= Democratic backsliding =

Drift towards authoritarianism

Since c. 2010, the number of countries autocratizing (blue) has been higher than those democratizing (yellow).

Democratic backsliding (Note: Other names include democratic decline, de-democratization, democratic erosion, democratic decay, democratic recession, democratic regression, and democratic deconsolidation.) is a form of autocratization, a process of structural government transition from democracy toward authoritarianism in which the exercise of political power becomes broader, less based on democracy, and more arbitrary and repressive. The process typically restricts the space for public contest and political participation in the process of government selection. Democratic backsliding involves the weakening of democratic institutions, such as when the transition of power becomes less peaceful or elections less free and fair, or when the powers that be violate individual rights that underpin democracies, especially freedom of expression.

Causes of democratic backsliding include economic inequality, unemployment, culture wars, culturally conservative reactions to societal changes, populist or personalist politics, and external influence from great power politics. Economic inequality is causing democratic backsliding in the 21st century, even in wealthy democracies. During crises, backsliding can occur when leaders impose autocratic rules during states of emergency that are either disproportionate to the severity of the crisis or remain in place after the situation has improved.

During the Cold War, democratic backsliding occurred repeatedly through coups. Since the end of the Cold War, democratic backsliding has occurred more frequently through the election of personalist leaders or parties that dismantle democratic institutions. During the third wave of democratization in 1974, many new, weakly institutionalized democracies were established; these regimes have been most vulnerable to democratic backsliding. The third wave of autocratization has been ongoing since 2010 after the Great Recession, when the number of liberal democracies was at an all-time high. More than half of all autocratization episodes over 1900–2023 have a U-turn shape in which the autocratization is closely followed by and linked to subsequent democratization.

In recent years, democratic backsliding has increasingly been observed not only in newer or weakly institutionalized democracies but also in long-established democratic systems. According to the V-Dem Institute's Democracy Report 2026, nearly a quarter of the world's countries were undergoing autocratization in 2025, including several in Europe and North America. The report also highlights growing concerns about declines in democratic quality and increasing pressures on media and journalists worldwide.

== Manifestations ==
Democratic backsliding occurs when essential components of democracy are threatened. Examples of democratic backsliding include:

- Free and fair elections are degraded;
- Liberal rights of freedom of speech, press and association decline, impairing the ability of the political opposition to challenge the government, hold it to account, and propose alternatives to the current regime;
- The rule of law (i.e., judicial and bureaucratic restraints on the government) is weakened, such as when the independence of the judiciary is threatened or when civil service tenure protections are weakened or eliminated. A weakening in the rule of law can produce uncertainty that leads to self-censorship.
- An over-emphasis on national security as a response to acts of terrorism or perceived antagonists.
- Increased distance between median voter preferences and governance.

== Forms ==
Democratic backsliding can occur in several common ways. Backsliding is often led by democratically elected leaders, who use "incremental rather than revolutionary" tactics. As emphasized by Steven Levitsky and Daniel Ziblatt, it is difficult to pinpoint a single specific moment at which a government is no longer democratic, given that this process of decline manifests "slowly, in barely visible steps." Ozan Varol uses the phrase "stealth authoritarianism" to describe the practice of an authoritarian leader (or a potential authoritarian leader) using "seemingly legitimate legal mechanisms for anti-democratic ends ... concealing anti-democratic practices under the mask of law." Together with Juan Linz (1996), Levitsky and Ziblatt developed and agreed upon their "litmus test," which includes what they believe to be the four key indicators of authoritarian behavior. These four factors are rejection of (or weak commitment to) democratic rules of the system; denial of the legitimacy of political opponents; toleration or encouragement of violence; and readiness to curtail civil liberties of opponents, including media. Varol describes the manipulation of libel laws, electoral laws, or "terrorism" laws as tools to target or discredit political opponents and the employment of democratic rhetoric as a distraction from anti-democratic practices as manifestations of stealth authoritarianism. In addition to these key signs derived from the behavior of leaders, Samuel P. Huntington also describes culture as a main contributor to democratic backsliding and goes on to argue that certain cultures are particularly hostile to democracy, but they do not necessarily prohibit democratization. Fabio Wolkenstein also cautions that some measures taken to weaken democracy can shift or concentrate power in longer-lasting ways that may not be easily reversed in the next election.

=== Promissory coups ===
In a promissory coup, an incumbent elected government is deposed in a coup d'état by coup leaders who claim to defend democracy and promise to hold elections to restore democracy. In these situations, coup-makers emphasize the temporary and necessary nature of their intervention to ensure democracy in the future. This is unlike the more open-ended coups that occurred during the Cold War. Political scientist Nancy Bermeo says that "The share of successful coups that fall into the promissory category has risen significantly, from 35 percent before 1990 to 85 percent afterward." Examining 12 promissory coups in democratic states between 1990 and 2012, Bermeo found that "Few promissory coups were followed quickly by competitive elections, and fewer still paved the way for improved democracies."

=== Executive aggrandizement ===
In political science, executive aggrandizement refers to the expansion of the leader's power beyond the checks and balances provided by the legislature and the judiciary or by interfering with the independence of the public service. Even a legitimately elected leader can undermine democracy or cause a democratic backlash by using government resources to weaken his political opposition.

This process contains a series of institutional changes by elected executives, impairing the ability of the political opposition to challenge the government and hold it to account. The most important feature of executive aggrandizement is that the institutional changes are made through legal channels, making it seem as if the elected official has a democratic mandate. Some examples of executive aggrandizement are the decline of media freedom and the weakening of the rule of law (i.e., judicial and bureaucratic restraints on the government), such as when judicial autonomy is threatened.

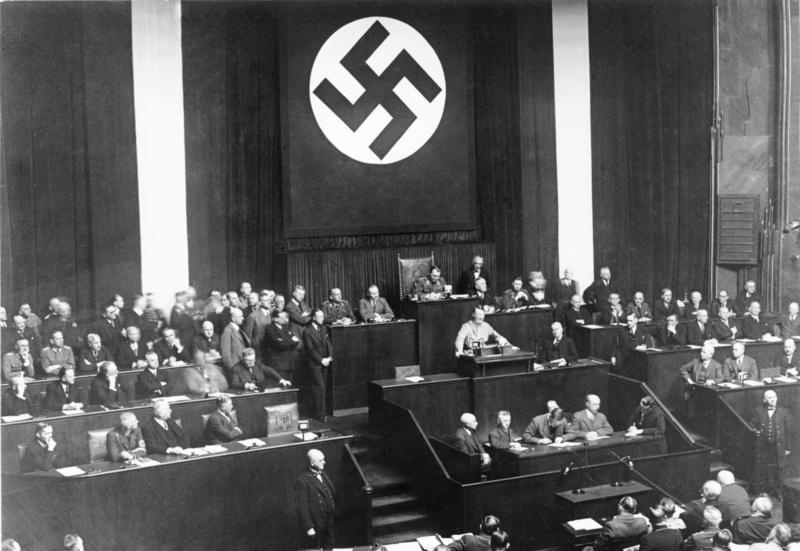
Adolf Hitler gives a speech to the Reichstag in support of the Enabling Act. The collapse of the Weimar Republic into Nazi Germany is perhaps the most infamous example of democratic backsliding.

Over time, there has been a decline in active coups (in which a power-seeking individual, or small group, seizes power through force, violently removing an existing government) and self-coups (involving "a freely elected chief executive suspending the constitution outright in order to amass power in one swift sweep") and an increase in executive aggrandizement. Political scientist Nancy Bermeo notes that executive aggrandizement occurs over time, through institutional changes legitimized through legal means, such as new constituent assemblies, referendums, or "existing courts or legislatures ... in cases where supporters of the executive gain majority control of such bodies." Bermeo notes that these methods mean that the aggrandizement of the executive "can be framed as having resulted from a democratic mandate." Populist rhetoric, which frames the executive as the sole legitimate representative of the people, has been shown to increase public support for executive aggrandizing actions. Executive aggrandizement is characterized by the presence of distress in axes of democracy, including institutional or horizontal accountability; and executive or discursive accountability.

=== Legislative authoritarianism ===
Legislative authoritarianism is the use of elected legislatures to consolidate power and undermine democratic accountability while upholding formal democratic processes. Because legislative authoritarianism operates through legally sanctioned procedures and maintains the external appearance of democratic governance, scholars point out that it is particularly challenging to identify. But over time, these actions may weaken legislative checks on executive power and diminish parliaments' ability to function as autonomous forums for political debate. Rather than sudden regime change, this type of erosion is most frequently seen in instances of democratic backsliding.

In 2026, Madeleine Rogers argued that parliamentary procedure had been used in democratic backsliding in six main ways that were difficult to oppose because of their technical nature and lack of public attention: fast-track procedures; time limits to debates (such as limiting speeches to 30 seconds in Poland); "alternative legislative procedures" that make scrutiny and opposition or amendment difficult; weakening opposition power, such as via committee composition fractions; "abusing disciplinary measures"; and a speaker abusing the expected neutrality of the speaker's role. Rogers proposed democratic resilience methods that she argued would make parliamentary procedure more robust against backsliding.

=== Incremental election subversion ===
This form of democratic backsliding, called "strategic election manipulation" by Bermeo, entails the subversion of free and fair elections by, for example, blocking media access, disqualifying opposition candidates, and voter suppression. This form of backsliding typically takes place before the voting day(s) of an election and is done in a slower and more incremental way so that the changes are difficult to counter, making it tougher for media and election monitoring bodies to find and broadcast the cumulative effect of the mostly small but significant misconduct.

== Causes and characteristics ==
The V-Party Dataset demonstrated a greater statistical significance of autocratization for victorious parties with very high populism, high anti-pluralism, lack of commitment to the democratic process, and incitement or acceptance of political violence.

=== Populism ===
Pippa Norris of the Harvard Kennedy School and the University of Sydney argues that the two "twin forces" pose the largest threat to Western liberal democracies: "sporadic and random terrorist attacks on domestic soil, which damage feelings of security, and the rise of populist-authoritarian forces, which feed parasitically upon these fears." Norris defines populism as "a governing style with three defining features":

1. A rhetorical emphasis on the idea that "legitimate political authority is based on popular sovereignty and majority rule";
2. Disapproval of, and challenges to the legitimacy of, established holders of "political, cultural, and economic power";
3. Leadership by "maverick outsiders" who claim "to speak for the vox populi and to serve ordinary people."

Some, but not all, populists are authoritarian, emphasizing "the importance of protecting traditional lifestyles against perceived threats from 'outsiders,' even at the expense of civil liberties and minority rights." According to Norris, the reinforcement of the insecurities from the "twin forces" has led to more support for populist-authoritarian leaders, and this latter risk was especially pronounced in the United States during the presidency of Donald Trump. For example, Norris argues that Trump benefited from the mistrust of "the establishment" and that he continuously sought to undermine faith in the legitimacy of the media and the independence of the courts.

In 2017, Cas Mudde and Cristóbal Rovira Kaltwasser wrote:

Populism does not have the same effect in each stage of the democratization process. In fact, we suggest that populism tends to play a positive role in the promotion of electoral or minimal democracy, but a negative role when it comes to fostering the development of a full-fledged liberal democratic regime. Consequently, while populism tends to favor the democratization of authoritarian regimes, it is prone to diminish the quality of liberal democracies. Populism supports popular sovereignty, but it is inclined to oppose any limitations on majority rule, such as judicial independence and minority rights. Populism-in-power has led to processes of de-democratization (e.g., [Viktor] Orbán in Hungary or Hugo Chávez in Venezuela) and, in some extreme cases, even to the breakdown of the democratic regime (e.g., [Alberto] Fujimori in Peru).

A 2018 analysis by political scientists Yascha Mounk and Jordan Kyle links populism to democratic backsliding, showing that since 1990, "13 right-wing populist governments have been elected; of these, five brought about significant democratic backsliding. Over the same time period, 15 left-wing populist governments were elected; of these, the same number, five, brought about significant democratic backsliding." On the level of public opinion, presidents' populist discourse is associated with greater tolerance for executive aggrandizement among citizens in Latin America.

A December 2018 report by the Tony Blair Institute for Global Change concluded that populist rule, whether left- or right-wing, leads to a significant risk of democratic backsliding. The authors examine the effect of populism on three major aspects of democracy: the quality of democracy in general, checks and balances on executive power, and citizens' right to politically participate in a meaningful way. They conclude that populist governments are four times more likely to cause harm to democratic institutions than non-populist governments. Also, more than half of populist leaders have amended or rewritten the countries' constitution, frequently in a way that eroded checks and balances on executive power. Lastly, populists attack individual rights such as freedom of the press, civil liberties, and political rights.

In a 2018 journal article on democratic backsliding, scholars Licia Cianetti, James Dawson, and Seán Hanley argued that the emergence of populist movements in Central and Eastern Europe, such as Andrej Babiš's ANO in the Czech Republic, is "a potentially ambiguous phenomenon, articulating genuine societal demands for political reform and pushing issues of good governance centre stage, but further loosening the weak checks and balances that characterise post-communist democracy and embedding private interests at the core of the state."

In a 2019 paper, presented to the International Society of Political Psychologists, Shawn Rosenberg argues that right-wing populism is exposing a vulnerability in democratic structures and that "democracy is likely to devour itself."

Around the world, citizens are voting away the democracies they claim to cherish. Scholars present evidence that this behaviour is driven in part by the belief that their opponents will undermine democracy first. In experimental studies, they revealed to partisans that their opponents are more committed to democratic norms than they think. As a result, the partisans became more committed to upholding democratic norms themselves and less willing to vote for candidates who break these norms. These findings suggest that aspiring autocrats may instigate democratic backsliding by accusing their opponents of subverting democracy and that we can foster democratic stability by informing partisans about the other side's commitment to democracy.

The term "populism" has been criticized as a misleading term for phenomena such as nativism and intentional promotion of authoritarianism by political elites.

=== Economic issues ===
Many political economy scholars, such as Daron Acemoglu and James A. Robinson, have investigated the effect of income inequality on the democratic breakdown. Studies of democratic collapse show that economic inequality is significantly higher in countries that eventually move towards a more authoritarian model.

Adolf Hitler's rise to power was connected to a high unemployment rate. Hungary is another example of a country where a large share of unemployed people, especially after the 2008 financial crisis, contributed to popular support for a national-populist party.

=== Institutional reforms ===
Recent research on Latin America shows that institutional reforms, often introduced during crises, sometimes worsen democratic backsliding. Reforms intended to strengthen presidential powers or address public discontent can fragment political landscapes, leaving democracies vulnerable to instability and populist pressures.

=== Loneliness ===
Loneliness can be associated with support of authoritarianism.

=== Personalism ===
A 2019 study found that personalism had an adverse impact on democracy in Latin America: "Presidents who dominate their own weakly organized parties are more likely to seek to concentrate power, undermine horizontal accountability, and trample the rule of law than presidents who preside over parties that have an independent leadership and an institutionalized bureaucracy." The same thing is also true in the Middle East, its most prevalent example being seemingly Turkey and the consolidation of power in the hands of the President Recep Tayyip Erdoğan, who has been in power since 2003.

=== COVID-19 ===
Many national governments worldwide delayed, postponed, or canceled a variety of democratic elections at both national and subnational governmental levels, resulting in the COVID-19 pandemic opening gaps in the action of democracy.

According to the V-Dem Institute, only 39% of all countries have committed no or only minor violations of democratic standards in response to COVID-19. According to Ingo Keilitz, both authoritarian leaders and surveillance capitalists used the pandemic to "make massive shifts and reprogramming of our sensibilities about privacy and civil liberties that may not be reversible." Keilitz saw this as a threat to judicial independence.

=== Great power politics ===
Great power transitions have contributed to democratic backsliding and the spread of authoritarianism in two ways: "First, the sudden rise of autocratic Great Powers led to waves of autocracy driven by conquest but also by self-interest and even admiration, as in the fascist wave of the 1930s or the post-1945 communist wave. Second, the sudden rise of democratic hegemons led to waves of democratization, but these waves inevitably overextended and collapsed, leading to failed consolidation and rollback."

=== Authoritarian values ===
Global variation in democracy is primarily explained by variance between popular adherence to authoritarian values vs. emancipative values, which explains around 70 percent of the variation of democracy between countries every year since 1960. Emancipative values, as measured by the World Values Survey, have been consistently rising over time in response to increasing economic prosperity.

A 2020 study, which used World Values Survey data, found that cultural conservatism was the ideological group most open to authoritarian governance within Western democracies. Within English-speaking Western democracies, "protection-based" attitudes combining cultural conservatism and leftist economic attitudes were the strongest predictor of support for authoritarian modes of governance.

Professor Jessica Stern and the political psychologist Karen Stenner write that international research finds that "perceptions of sociocultural threat" (such as rising ethnic diversity and tolerance for LGBT people) are more important in explaining how democracies turn authoritarian compared to economic inequality (though they include economic threats such as globalization and the rising prosperity of other ethnic groups). Stern and Stenner say about a third of the population in Western countries is predisposed to favor homogeneity, obedience, and strong leaders over diversity and freedom. In their view, authoritarianism is only loosely correlated with conservatism, which may defend a liberal democracy as the status quo.

Political scientist Christian Welzel argues that the third wave of democratization overshot the demand for democracy in some countries. Therefore, Welzel sees the current autocratization trend as regression to the mean but expects that it too will reverse in response to long-term changes in values.

=== Polarization, misinformation, incrementalism, and multi-factor explanations ===
The 2019 Annual Democracy Report of the V-Dem Institute at the University of Gothenburg identified three challenges confronting global democracy: (1) "government manipulation of media, civil society, rule of law, and elections"; (2) rising "toxic polarization," including "the division of society into distrustful, antagonistic camps"; diminishing "respect for opponents, factual reasoning, and engagement with society" among political elites; and increasing use of hate speech by political leaders; and (3) foreign disinformation campaigns, primarily digital and mostly affecting Taiwan, the United States, and former Soviet bloc nations such as Latvia.

According to Suzanne Mettler and Robert C. Lieberman, four characteristics have typically provided the conditions for democratic backsliding (alone or in combination): political polarization, racism and nativism, economic inequality, and excessive executive power. Stephen Haggard and Robert Kaufman highlight three key causes of backsliding: "the pernicious effects of polarization; realignments of party systems that enable elected autocrats to gain legislative power; and the incremental nature of derogations, which divides oppositions and keeps them off balance." A 2022 study linked polarization to support for undemocratic politicians.

==== Civil society ====
In the context of strong political polarization, civil society can contribute to democratic backsliding. In 1997, political scientist Sheri Berman argued that civil society does not necessarily strengthen a democracy and pointed to a particular case in which civil society weakened democracy: "A robust civil society helped scuttle the twentieth century's most critical democratic experiment, Weimar Germany." In 2021, she argued that citizens' associations weakened the Weimar Republic as a democracy in two ways: they strengthened "social divisions and animosities" in the equivalent of internet-epoch filter bubbles rather than bridging social divides; and the associations' organisational infrastructure was used by the Nazi Party to gain electoral power. Berman argued that for civil society in the United States (US), the political polarization of 2021 was qualitatively similar to that of the Weimar Republic, and she recommended that people "concerned with democracy" in the US should "figur[e] out how to promote the types of networks and associations that can help Americans bridge their current divides."

=== Effects of judicial independence ===
A 2011 study examined the effects of judicial independence in preventing democratic backsliding. The study, which analyzed 163 countries from 1960 to 2000, concluded that established independent judiciaries are successful at preventing democracies from drifting to authoritarianism, but that states with newly formed courts "are positively associated with regime collapses in both democracies and non-democracies." In the early 2020s, studies of V-Dem democracy indices found that judicial interventions played a role in democratic resilience.

== Prevalence and trends ==
Countries autocratizing (red) or democratizing (blue) substantially and significantly (2010–2020), according to the V-Dem Democracy indices. Countries in grey are substantially unchanged.

An analysis based on the V-Dem Democracy indices from the V-Dem Institute, which contains more than eighteen million data points relevant to democracy, measuring 350 highly specific indicators across 174 countries as of the end of 2016, found that the number of democracies in the world modestly declined from 100 in 2011 to 97 in 2017; some countries moved toward democracy, while other countries moved away from democracy. V-Dem's 2019 Annual Democracy Report found that the trend of autocratization continued, while "24 countries are now severely affected by what is established as a 'third wave of autocratization,'" including "populous countries such as Brazil, Bangladesh, and the United States, as well as several Eastern European countries" (specifically Bulgaria and Serbia). The report found that an increasing proportion of the world population lived in countries undergoing autocratization (2.3 billion in 2018). The report found that while the majority of countries were democracies, the number of liberal democracies declined to 39 by 2018 (down from 44 a decade earlier). The research group Freedom House, in reports in 2017 and 2019, identified democratic backsliding in a variety of regions across the world. Freedom House's 2019 Freedom in the World report, titled Democracy in Retreat, showed freedom of expression declining each year over the preceding 13 years, with sharper drops since 2012.

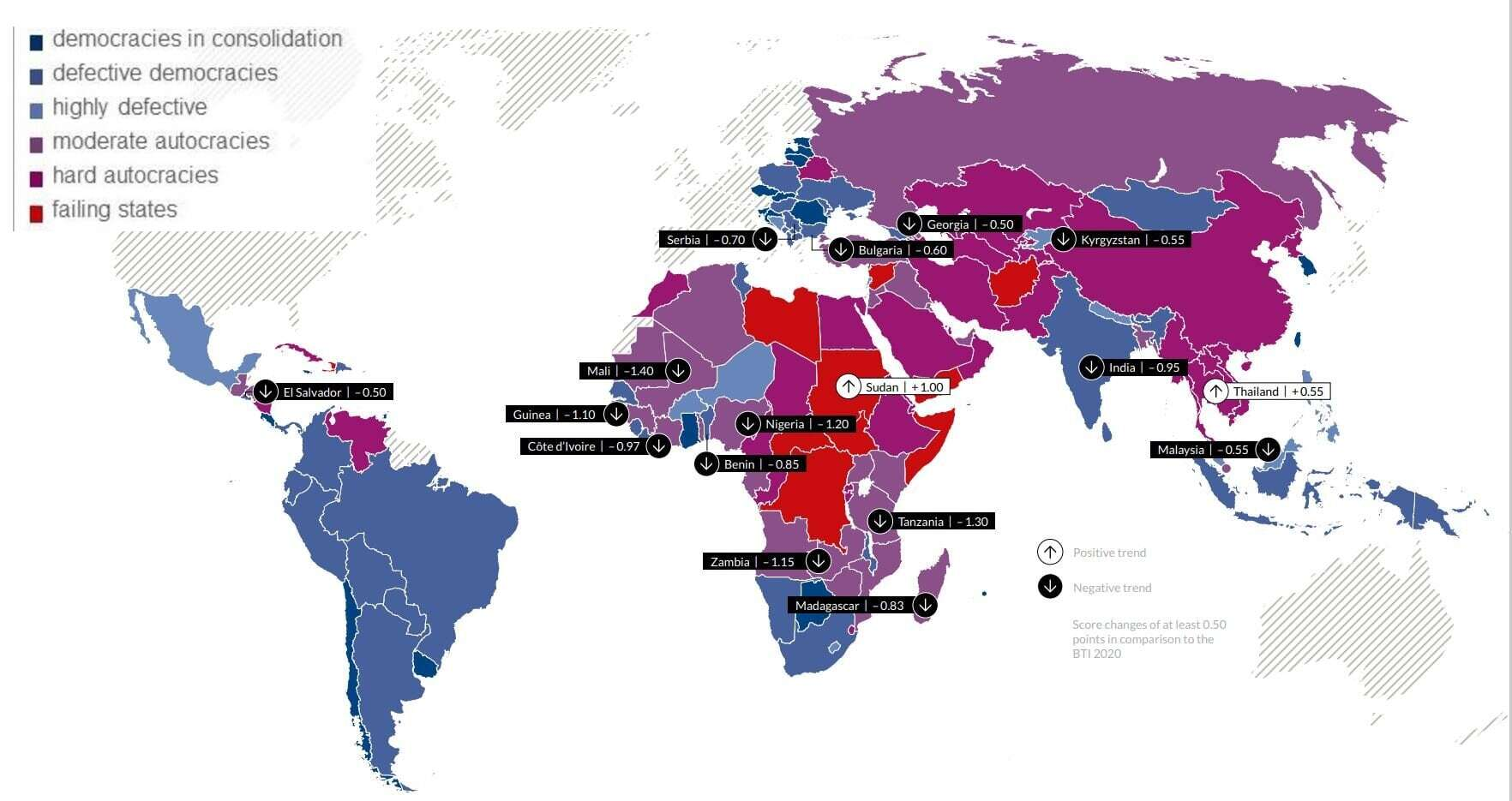
Global trend report Bertelsmann Transformation Index 2022

Scholarly work in the 2010s detailed democratic backsliding, in various forms and to various extents, in Hungary and Poland, the Czech Republic, Turkey, Brazil, Venezuela, and India. The scholarly recognition of the concept of democratic backsliding reflects a reversal from older views, which held "that democracy, once attained in a fairly wealthy state, would become a permanent fixture." This older view came to be realized as erroneous beginning in the mid-2000s, as multiple scholars acknowledged that some seemingly stable democracies have recently faced a decline in the quality of their democracy. Huq and Ginsburg identified in an academic paper "37 instances in 25 different countries in the postwar period in which democratic quality declined significantly (though a fully authoritarian regime didn't emerge)," including countries that were "seemingly stable, reasonably wealthy" democracies. The V-Dem Democracy Report identified for the year 2025 24 cases of stand-alone autocratization and 20 cases of bell-turn autocratization.

Country	Backsliding since	Ruling group or person	Ref.
Albania	2013	Socialist Party of Albania, under Edi Rama	
Argentina	2023	La Libertad Avanza, under Javier Milei	
Central African Republic	2019	United Hearts Movement, under Faustin-Archange Touadéra	
El Salvador	2019	Nuevas Ideas, under Nayib Bukele	
Ethiopia	2018	Prosperity Party, under Abiy Ahmed	
Georgia	2019	Georgian Dream – Democratic Georgia, especially under Irakli Kobakhidze	
Greece	2020	New Democracy, under Kyriakos Mitsotakis	
India	2014	Bharatiya Janata Party, under Narendra Modi	
Israel	2022	Likud – National Liberal Movement, under Benjamin Netanyahu	
Kyrgyzstan	2020	Mekenchil, under Sadyr Japarov	
Mexico	2020	Morena, under Andrés Manuel López Obrador and Claudia Sheinbaum	
Nicaragua	2007	Sandinista National Liberation Front, under Daniel Ortega	
Serbia	2012	Serbian Progressive Party, under Aleksandar Vučić	
Slovakia	2023	Direction – Social Democracy, under Robert Fico	
Turkey	2013	Justice and Development Party, under Recep Tayyip Erdoğan	
United States	2025	Republican Party, under Donald Trump	

The 2020 report of the Varieties of Democracy Institute found that the global share of democracies declined from 54% in 2009 to 49% in 2019 and that a greater share of the global population lived in autocratizing countries (6% in 2009, 34% in 2019). The 10 countries with the highest degree of democratizing from 2009 to 2019 were Tunisia, Armenia, The Gambia, Sri Lanka, Madagascar, Myanmar, Fiji, Kyrgyzstan, Ecuador, and Niger; the 10 countries with the highest degree of autocratizing from 2009 to 2019 were Hungary, Turkey, Poland, Serbia, Brazil, Bangladesh, Mali, Thailand, Nicaragua, and Zambia. However, the institute found that signs of hope in an "unprecedented degree of mobilization for democracy" were reflected in increases in pro-democracy mass mobilization; the proportion of countries with "substantial pro-democracy mass protests" increased to 44% in 2019 (from 27% in 2009). According to a 2020 study, "Democratic backsliding does not necessarily see all democratic institutions erode in parallel fashion... we establish that elections are improving and rights are retracting in the same time period and in many of the same cases." Democracy indices with varying democracy concepts and measurement approaches show different extents of recent global democracy decline.

== Case studies ==
=== Asia ===
Democratic backsliding is occurring in some parts of Asia. According to Our World in Data, the region's average democracy score has fallen 0.45 points in the decade from 2014 to 2024; the world average fell 0.38 points in the same timeframe. The COVID-19 pandemic is often held to have contributed to these trends, as national leaders made use of the "securitization of social issues" to justify authoritarian practices and suspension of rights as sacrifices in the "war" against the pandemic.

Various external factors are often credited with the democratic backsliding, and accompanying hardening of authoritarian regimes, in the region, including the rising influence of China and other authoritarian states, the decline of democracy promotion by the US and other actors, and the worldwide increase in misinformation and political polarization due to social media. Some scholars, however, consider domestic factors to be more significant causally. Regardless of causation, multiple forms of democratic backsliding can be observed to have taken place in East Asia from the mid-2010s to the present.

Executive aggrandizement may be found in the Philippines, Indonesia, and South Korea, albeit in differing forms. Duterte's "war on drugs," which is a specific form of aggrandizement referred to as grievance-fueled illiberalism, resulted in an expansion of executive and police power. Rodrigo Duterte emphasized the threat of criminal drug activity and the failure of the establishment to punish those responsible, and was elected on promises to make sure drug criminals were punished; the resulting campaign has resulted in the deaths of over 12,000 Filipinos, at least 2,555 of which can be attributed to the Philippine National Police, and which some human rights organizations say could amount to crimes against humanity. Meanwhile, Joko Widodo expanded executive power and military influence in Indonesia to the point where he was compared with its infamous dictator Suharto. On 3 December 2024, South Korea's then-President Yoon declared martial law and attempted to disband its representative body in an instance of executive aggrandizement specifically referred to as opportunistic authoritarianism. Yoon's coup was thwarted by the strength of South Korea's democratic institutions, and he is currently facing a criminal trial for charges of insurrection.

The 2021 military coup in Myanmar is an example of "Entrenched-Interest Revanchism," in which an entrenched interest group displaced by a country's democratic transition uses undemocratic means to reassert its claims. Myanmar experienced elite-driven democratization between 2011 and 2015 and held its first general elections in 2015, resulting in a victory for the National League for Democracy (NLD). The NLD won an even greater margin of victory over the military's proxy party in the 2020 elections, which prompted a 2021 coup that re-established military rule through a military junta. The military government has since engaged in an ethnic-cleansing campaign against the country's Rohingya minority.

In the 2010s and 2020s, the Chinese government gradually installed rules to establish criteria for candidates to run in Hong Kong elections that more and more strongly favoured those sympathetic to the Chinese Communist Party. Following the 2019–2020 Hong Kong protests, new rules significantly weakened Hong Kong's democratic structure: the 2020 Hong Kong national security law "effectively criminalizes any dissent" and the 2024 Safeguarding National Security Ordinance was expected to have chilling effects.

=== Central and Eastern Europe ===
In the 2010s, a scholarly consensus developed that the Central and Eastern Europe region was experiencing democratic backsliding, most prominently in Hungary and Poland, and the European Union (EU) failed to prevent democratic backsliding in some of its other member states. Rutgers University political scientist R. Daniel Kelemen argues that EU membership enabled an "authoritarian equilibrium" and may have made it easier for authoritarian-minded leaders to erode democracy due to the EU's system of party politics, a reluctance to interfere in domestic political matters; appropriation of EU funds by backsliding regimes; and free movement for dissatisfied citizens, which allows citizens to leave backsliding regimes and deplete the opposition while strengthening the regimes. According to a 2020 poll by Dalia Research, only 38 percent of Polish citizens and 36 percent of Hungarian citizens believed that their countries were democratic, while the rest said that they would like their countries to be more democratic.

Similar concerns about democratic backsliding and institutional erosion were raised in EU candidate countries and the Western Balkans, including Turkey, Albania, and Serbia, with problems including executive concentration of power and procedural problems in the functioning of judicial and political institutions. In Turkey, the European Court of Human Rights (ECHR) found violations related to pre-trial detention, ruling in some cases that such detention was "unlawful and arbitrary" and lacked reasonable suspicion, raising broader concerns about due process and judicial independence. In Albania, concerns have been raised regarding the implementation of judicial reforms and the use of pre-trial detention. The Venice Commission stated that extensive or disproportionate use of pre-trial detention risks undermining the presumption of innocence, stifling political pluralism, and limiting democratic debate. In Serbia, analysts stated that factors of democratic decline included weakened judicial independence, constraints on media, and irregularities in electoral processes.

=== United States ===
The V-Dem Institute said in 2026 regarding Trump's presidency that "the speed with which American democracy is currently dismantled is unprecedented in modern history". The institute noted executive overreach undermining the rule of law, suppression and intimidation of media and dissenting voices, loss of legislative constraints, and declining civil rights, equality, and freedom of expression.

Beginning in October 2025, The New York Times editorial board published an Autocracy Index showing erosion of US democracy using various benchmarks, offering "a way to understand how much Mr. Trump is eroding American democracy" since his January 2025 inauguration.

Democratic backsliding has been identified as a trend in the United States at the state and national levels in various indices and analyses, primarily during the Jim Crow era and in the 21st century under Donald Trump. It is "a process of regime change towards autocracy that makes the exercise of political power more arbitrary and repressive, and that restricts the space for public contestation and political participation in the process of government selection".

The Jim Crow era is among the most-cited historical examples of democratic backsliding, with Black Americans in particular seeing their rights eroded dramatically, especially in the Southern United States. Backsliding in the 21st century has been discussed as largely a Republican-led phenomenon, with particular emphasis placed on the administrations of Donald Trump.

Drivers include decisions made by the Supreme Court under John Roberts (especially those regarding money in politics and gerrymandering), attempts at election subversion, and the concentration of political power among the ultra-wealthy (plutocracy). Other tendencies include a growing interest in political violence, Christian nationalism, anti-LGBTQ rhetoric, and white identity politics. The second Trump administration's Make America Healthy Again initiative has also promoted medical pseudoscience involving opposition to vaccination, transgender healthcare misinformation, fad diets, and alternative medicine.

A paper published in The Annals of the American Academy of Political and Social Science said, "Trump undermined faith in elections, encouraged political violence, vilified the mainstream media, [and] positioned himself as a law-and-order strongman challenging immigrants and suppressing protests." These developments have resulted in a number of indices and experts ceasing to classify the country as a democracy. The Polity data series classified the United States as an "anocracy" following the attempted self-coup by Trump in the January 6 United States Capitol attack of 2021; in 2024 and 2025, it was further downgraded and, by October 2025, described as "no longer considered a democracy" and lying "at the cusp of autocracy."

Bright Line Watch made similar statements in September 2025, describing expert ratings of the country as "closer to those of a mixed or illiberal democracy than a full democracy." (Note: Bright Line Watch describes an illiberal democracy as including: executive influence on the judiciary, weak enforcement of financial laws, pressure on the media and selective access, partial manipulation of official statistics, and firing of government employees based on political criteria.)

== See also ==
- Constitutional crisis – Conflict a governing law is unable to resolve
- Declinism – Belief that something is tending towards decline
- Rotation of power – Government structure and democratic principle
- Slippery slope – Rhetorical argument

== Sources ==
- Jardina, Ashley; Mickey, Robert (2022). "White Racial Solidarity and Opposition to American Democracy". The Annals of the American Academy of Political and Social Science. 699 (1): 79–89. doi:10.1177/00027162211069730. S2CID 247499954.
- Rowland, Robert C. (2021). The Rhetoric of Donald Trump: Nationalist Populism and American Democracy. University Press of Kansas. ISBN 978-0-7006-3196-4.
