= Confederation =

Union of sovereign states linked by treaty

A confederation (also known as a confederacy or league) is a formal alliance of sovereign states united for purposes of common action. Usually created by a treaty, confederations of states tend to be established for dealing with critical issues, such as defence, foreign relations, internal trade or currency, with the central government being required to provide support for all its members. Confederalism represents a main form of intergovernmentalism, defined as any form of interaction around states that takes place on the basis of sovereign independence or government.

The nature of the relationship among the member states constituting a confederation varies considerably. Likewise, the relationship between the member states and the general government and their distribution of powers varies. Some looser confederations are similar to international organisations while other confederations with stricter rules may resemble federal systems. These elements of such confederations, the international organization and federalist perspective, has been combined as supranational unions.

Since the member states of a confederation retain their sovereignty, they are generally understood to have the implicit right of secession, although in practice this right may be constrained by legal arrangements or increasing centralization that makes the confederation functionally similar to a federation. The political philosopher Emmerich de Vattel said: "Several sovereign and independent states may unite themselves together by a perpetual confederacy without each, in particular, ceasing to be a perfect state.... The deliberations in common will offer no violence to the sovereignty of each member".

Under a confederation, compared to a federal state, the central authority is relatively weak. Decisions made by the general government in a unicameral legislature, a council of the member states, require subsequent implementation by the member states to take effect; they are not laws acting directly upon the individual but have more the character of interstate agreements. Also, decision-making in the general government usually proceeds by consensus (unanimity), not by the majority. Historically, those features limit the union's effectiveness. Hence, political pressure tends to build over time for the transition to a federal system of government, as in the American, Swiss and German cases of regional integration.

== Confederated states ==
In terms of internal structure, every confederal state is composed of two or more constituent states, referred to as confederated states. Regarding their political systems, confederated states can have republican or monarchical forms of government. Those that have a republican form (confederated republics) are usually called states (like states of the American Confederacy, 1861–1865) or republics (like republics of Serbia and Montenegro within the former State Union of Serbia and Montenegro, 2003–2006). Those that have a monarchical form of government (confederated monarchies) are defined by various hierarchical ranks (like kingdoms of Iraq and Jordan within the Hashemite Arab Union in 1958).

== Examples ==
=== Belgium ===
The Kingdom of Belgium is constitutionally a federal state composed of three Communities and three Regions. It evolved from a unitary state through successive state reforms beginning in 1970 and was formally designated a federal state in 1993. The federal state, the Communities and the Regions are legally on an equal footing within their respective areas of competence, rather than forming a general hierarchy in which federal law automatically takes precedence.

Belgium is nevertheless sometimes described in academic literature as an atypical or sui generis federation with some confederal characteristics. Constitutional scholar Patricia Popelier notes that Belgium is commonly described as a federal system with "confederal traits", particularly because of the extensive autonomy of its federated entities and the formal and informal veto mechanisms of the major language groups in federal decision-making. More recent scholarship likewise characterizes Belgium as an atypical, centrifugal federation with far-reaching autonomy for the Communities and Regions. In the traditional constitutional-law definition, however, a confederation consists of sovereign states joined in a treaty-based association, whereas Belgium's Communities and Regions are constituent entities of a single federal state.

Belgian fiscal federalism likewise does not establish a simple hierarchy in which the federal government dominates the federated entities. The OECD notes that the federal, regional and community governments are not legally subordinate to one another in budgetary policy. The Sixth State Reform increased the fiscal autonomy of the Regions, although public debt and deficits remain concentrated to a significant extent at the federal level.

Belgian politics is strongly segmented along linguistic lines. Most political parties operate primarily within one language community, and academic research describes Belgium as having a split party system; the PVDA/PTB is a partial exception to the absence of statewide parties. Belgium is also widely studied as a consociational democracy, in which power-sharing and minority-protection mechanisms have been used to accommodate linguistic divisions.

=== Canada ===
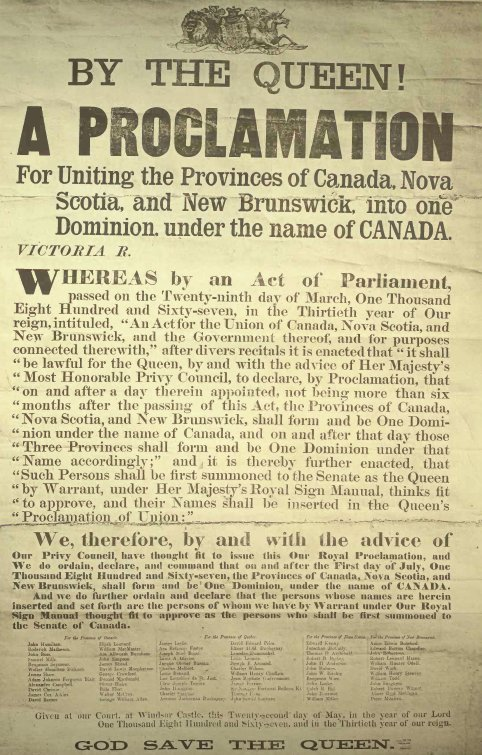
Proclamation of Canadian Confederation

Canada is an unusually decentralized federal state, not a confederate association of sovereign states, the usual meaning of confederation in modern terms. In Canada, the word confederation has an additional unrelated meaning. "Confederation" refers to the process of (or the event of) establishing or joining the Canadian federal state.

In modern terminology, Canada is a federation, not a confederation. However, to contemporaries of the Constitution Act, 1867, confederation did not have the same connotation of a weakly-centralized federation. Canadian Confederation generally refers to the Constitution Act, 1867, which formed the Dominion of Canada from three of the colonies of British North America, and to the subsequent incorporation of other colonies and territories. Beginning on 1 July 1867, it was initially a self-governing dominion of the British Empire with a federal structure, whose government was led by Sir John A. Macdonald. The initial colonies involved were the Province of Canada (becoming Quebec from Canada East, formerly the colony of Lower Canada; and Ontario from Canada West, formerly the colony of Upper Canada), Nova Scotia, and New Brunswick. Later participants were Manitoba, British Columbia, Prince Edward Island, Alberta and Saskatchewan (the latter two created in 1905 as federated provinces from parts of the directly federally administered Northwest Territories, first transferred to the Dominion in 1869 and now possessing devolved governments as itself, Yukon and Nunavut), and finally Newfoundland (now Newfoundland and Labrador) in 1949. A Canadian judicial constitutional interpretation, Reference Re Secession of Quebec, and a subsequent federal law, set forth negotiating conditions for a Canadian province (though not a territory) to leave the Canadian federal state (addressed also by a related Quebec law). Importantly, negotiation would first need triggering by referendum and executing by constitutional amendment using a current amending mechanism of Canada's constitution—meaning that, while not legal under the current constitution, it is democratically feasible without resorting to extralegal means or international involvement.

=== European Union ===
The unique nature and the political sensitivities surrounding the European Union (EU) make it difficult to apply a common or legal classification to its structure. However, it bears some resemblance to both a confederation (or a "new" type of confederation) and a federation. The term supranational union has also been applied. The EU operates common economic policies with thousands of common laws, which enable a single economic market, a common customs territory, (mainly) open internal borders, and a common currency among most member-states. However, unlike a federation, the EU does not have exclusive powers over foreign affairs, defence, taxation, along with the immigration and transit of non-EU nationals. Furthermore, most EU laws, which have been developed by consensus between relevant national government ministers and then scrutinised and approved or rejected by the European Parliament, must be transposed into national law by national parliaments (in the case of directives). Most collective decisions by member states are taken by weighted majorities and blocking minorities typical of upper houses in federations. On the other hand, the absolute unanimity typical of intergovernmentalism is required only in respect to the Common Foreign and Security Policy, as well as in situations when ratification of a treaty or of a treaty amendment is required. Such a form may thus be described as a semi-intergovernmental confederation.

However, some academic observers more usually discuss the EU in the terms of it being a federation. As the international law professor Joseph H. H. Weiler (of the Hague Academy and New York University) wrote, "Europe has charted its own brand of constitutional federalism". Jean-Michel Josselin and Alain Marciano see the European Court of Justice in Luxembourg City as being a primary force behind the building of a federal legal order for the EU, with Josselin stating that a "complete shift from a confederation to a federation would have required to straight-forwardly replace the principality of the member states vis-à-vis the Union by that of the European citizens. As a consequence, both confederate and federate features coexist in the judicial landscape". Rutgers political science professor R. Daniel Kelemen said: "Those uncomfortable using the 'F' word in the EU context should feel free to refer to it as a quasi-federal or federal-like system. Nevertheless, the EU has the necessary attributes of a federal system. It is striking that while many scholars of the EU continue to resist analyzing it as a federation, most contemporary students of federalism view the EU as a federal system". Thomas Risse and Tanja A. Börzel claim that the "EU only lacks two significant features of a federation. First, the Member States remain the "masters" of the treaties, i.e., they have the exclusive power to amend or change the constitutive treaties of the EU. Second, the EU lacks a real "tax and spend" capacity, in other words, there is no fiscal federalism".

Valéry Giscard d'Estaing, the chairman of the body of experts commissioned to elaborate a constitutional charter for the European Union, was confronted with strong opposition from the United Kingdom towards including the words "federal" or "federation" in the unratified European Constitution and the word was replaced with either "Community" or "Union".

A majority of the Political Groups in the European Parliament, including the EPP, the S&D Group and Renew Europe, support a federal model for the European Union. The ECR Group argues for a reformed European Union along confederal lines. The Brothers of Italy party, led by Giorgia Meloni, campaigns for a confederal Europe. On her election as President of the ECR Party in September 2020 Meloni said, "Let us continue to fight together for a confederate Europe of free and sovereign states".

=== Indigenous confederations in North America ===
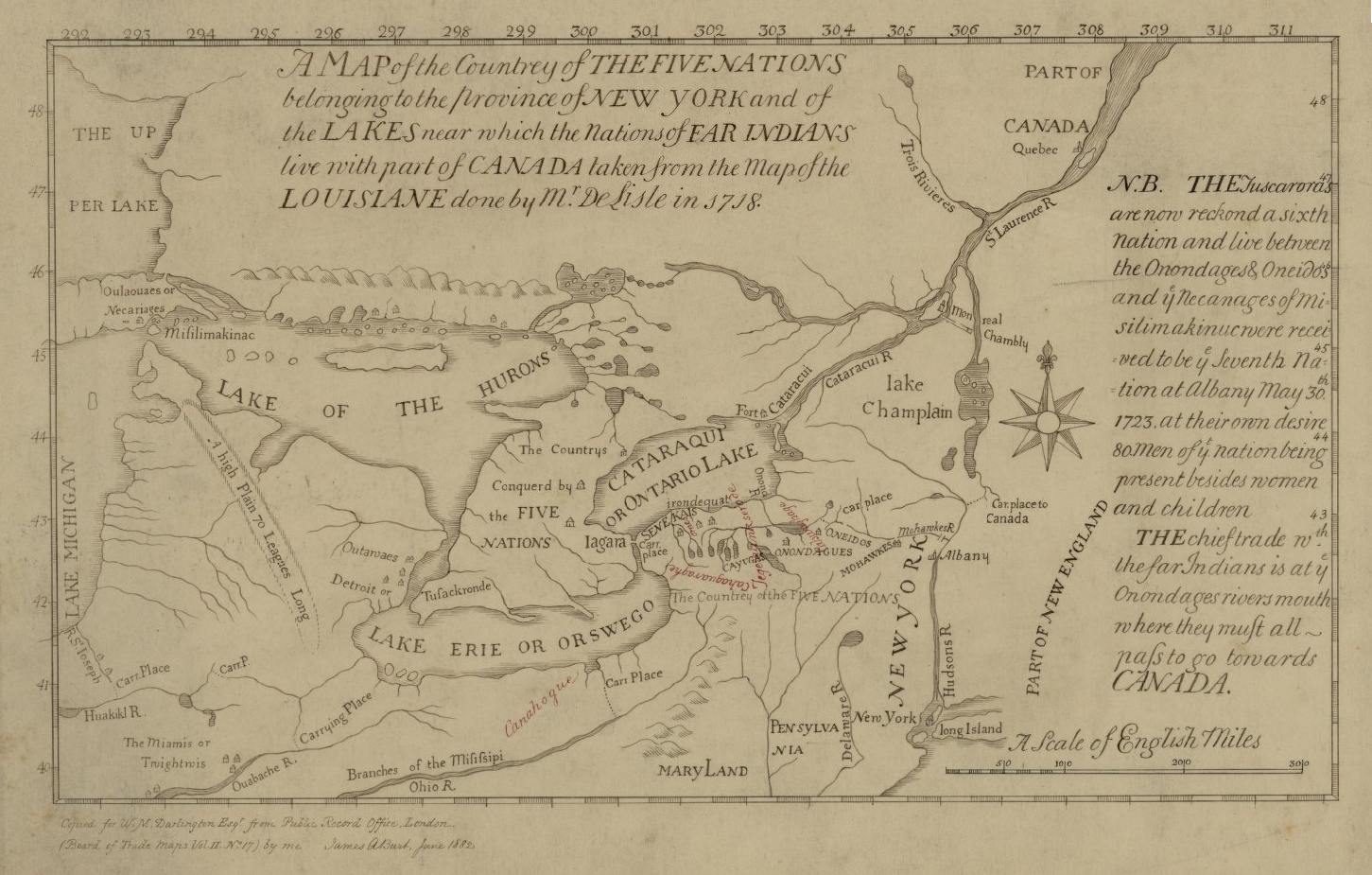
Map of the Five Nations (from the Darlington Collection)

In the context of the history of the indigenous peoples of the Americas, a confederacy may refer to a semi-permanent political and military alliance consisting of multiple nations (or "tribes", "bands", or "villages"), which maintained their separate leadership. One of the most well-known is the Haudenosaunee (or Iroquois), but there were many others during different eras and locations across North America, such as the Wabanaki Confederacy, Western Confederacy, Tsenacommacah, Seven Nations of Canada, Pontiac's Confederacy, Pennacook Confederacy, Illinois Confederation, Tecumseh's Confederacy, Powhatan Confederacy, Muscogee Confederacy, Great Sioux Nation, Blackfoot Confederacy, Warm Springs Confederacy, Manahoac Confederacy, Iron Confederacy and Council of Three Fires.

The Haudenosaunee Confederacy, historically known as the Iroquois League or the League of Five (later Six) Nations, is the country of Native Americans (in what is now the United States) and First Nations (in what is now Canada) that consists of six nations: the Mohawk, the Oneida, the Onondaga, the Cayuga, the Seneca and the Tuscarora. The Six Nations have a representative government known as the Grand Council which is the oldest governmental institution still maintaining its original form in North America. Each clan from the five nations sends chiefs to act as representatives and make decisions for the whole confederation. It has been operating since its foundation in 1142 despite limited international recognition today.

=== Indigenous confederations in South America ===
Several of the Pre-Columbian cultures of Colombia, such as the Muisca and Tairona were composed of loose confederations. The Muisca form of government consisted of two different rulers that governed a region in the central Andean highlands in present-day Colombia. The Hoa ruled the northern section of the confederation, while the Zipa ruled the southern portion.

The Andean civilizations consisted of loose confederations, such as the Aymara kingdoms and the Diaguita, with the former being composed of distinct diarchies.

=== Serbia and Montenegro ===
In 2003, the Federal Republic of Yugoslavia was transformed into the State Union of Serbia and Montenegro, a confederation of the Republic of Montenegro and the Republic of Serbia. The state was constituted as a loose political union, but formally functioned as a sovereign subject of international law, and member of the United Nations. As a confederation, the State Union of Serbia and Montenegro had very few shared functions, such as defense, foreign affairs and a weak common president, cabinet and parliament.

The two constituent republics functioned separately throughout the period of its short existence, and they continued to operate under separate economic policies and to use separate currencies (the euro was and still is the only legal tender in Montenegro, and the dinar was and still is the legal tender in Serbia). On 21 May 2006, the Montenegrin independence referendum was held. The final official results indicated on 31 May that 55.5% of voters voted in favor of independence. The confederation effectively came to an end after Montenegro's formal declaration of independence on 3 June 2006 and Serbia's formal declaration of independence on 5 June.

=== Switzerland ===
Switzerland, officially known as the Swiss Confederation, is an example of a modern country that traditionally refers to itself as a confederation because the official (and traditional) name of Switzerland in German (the majority language of the Swiss) is Schweizerische Eidgenossenschaft (literally "Swiss Comradeship by Oath"), an expression which was translated into the Latin Confoederatio Helvetica (Helvetic Confederation). It had been a confederacy since its inception in 1291 as the Old Swiss Confederacy, which was originally created as an alliance among the valley communities of the central Alps, until it became a federation in 1848 but it retains the name of Confederacy for reasons of historical tradition. The confederacy facilitated management of common interests (such as freedom from external domination especially from the Habsburg Empire, the development of republican institutions in a Europe dominated by monarchies and free trade), and it ensured peace between the different cultural entities of the area.

After the Sonderbund War of 1847, when some of the Catholic cantons of Switzerland attempted to set up a separate union (Sonderbund in German) against the Protestant majority, a vote was held and the majority of the cantons approved the new Federal Constitution which changed the political system to one of a federation.

=== Union State of Russia and Belarus ===
In 1999, Russia and Belarus signed a treaty to form a confederation, which came into force on 26 January 2000. Although it was given the name Union State and was initially intended to create federation, it remains a confederation of an uncompleted nature. Its existence has been seen as an indication of Russia's political and economic support for the government of Alexander Lukashenko.

The Union State was created with the objective of coordinating economic and foreign affairs. However, many of the treaty's provisions have not yet been implemented.

=== Alliance of Sahel States ===
On July 6, 2024, at the end of the first summit of the Alliance of Sahel States (AES), the final communiqué announced the creation of a confederation of the three countries of the AES, namely Mali, Burkina Faso and Niger. All three countries were members of ECOWAS, before their memberships were suspended after a successive string of military coups. Subsequently, the countries withdrew from ECOWAS and formed the AES.

== Historical confederations ==
Historical confederations (especially those predating the 20th century) may not fit the current definition of a confederation, may be proclaimed as a federation but be confederal (or the reverse), and may not show any qualities that 21st-century political scientists might classify as those of a confederation.

=== List ===
Some have more the characteristics of a personal union, but appear here because of their self-styling as a "confederation":

Name	Period	Notes
Three Crowned Kings	1050 BCE–second century BCE	As described in the Hathigumpha inscription, On the 11th year, Kharavela broke up a confederacy of Tamil kingdoms, which was becoming a threat to Kalinga Kharavela.
Toltec Empire	496–1122	Existed as a confederation between the Toltecs and the Chichimeca, simultaneously as an empire exerting control over places like Cholula.
Holy Roman Empire	800/962–1806	De jure an empire, de facto a multi-ethnic Christian confederation of German, Italian, Czech, Dutch, and French states.
Muisca Confederation	c. 800–1540	Consisted of the Southern Muisca of Bacatá led by the Zipazgo and the Northern Muisca of Hunza led by the Zacazgo.
Tui Manuʻa Confederacy		
Kimek–Kipchak confederation	9th century–13th century	A Turkic confederation in the eastern part of the Eurasian Steppe, between the 9th and 13th centuries. The confederation was dominated by two Turkic nomadic tribes: the Kimeks and the Kipchaks.
Cumania	10th century–1242	A Turkic confederation in the western part of the Eurasian Steppe, between the 10th and 13th centuries. The confederation was dominated by two Turkic nomadic tribes: the Cumans and the Kipchaks.
League of Mayapan	987–1461	
Haudenosaunee	1142–present	Also known as the Iroquois Confederacy or the Six (formerly Five) Nations.
Hanseatic League	13th–17th centuries	Member cities located in present-day Belgium, Estonia, Germany, Latvia, Lithuania, Netherlands, Poland, Russia, and Sweden.
Old Swiss Confederacy	1291–1848	Officially, the "Swiss Confederation".
Qara Qoyunlu	1374–1468	A Turkoman tribal confederation.
Aq Qoyunlu	1378–1503	A Turkoman tribal confederation.
(Kalmar Union) Kalmar Union^{a}	1397–1523	Parts of present-day Denmark, Norway, and Sweden.
Aztec Empire	1428–1521	Consisted of the city-states of Tenochtitlan, Texcoco, and Tlacopan.
Livonian Confederation	1435–1561	
Pre-Commonwealth Poland and Lithuania^{a}	1447–1492; 1501–1569	Shared a monarch (Grand Duke of Lithuania and King of Poland), parliament (Sejm), and currency.
(Denmark–Norway) Denmark–Norway^{a}	1536–1814	Present-day Denmark and Norway.
(Dutch Republic) Seven United Provinces of the Netherlands	1581–1795	
Wampanoag Confederacy		
Powhatan Confederacy		
Illinois Confederation		
Confederate Ireland	1641–1649	
New England Confederation	1643–1684	
Kingdom of Lunda	c. 1665–1887	
Aro Confederacy	1690–1902	Parts of present-day Nigeria, Cameroon, and Equatorial Guinea.
Maratha Confederacy	1713–1818	
The United States of America	1781–1789	Organization of the United States under the Articles of Confederation.
Western Confederacy	1785–1795	
Tecumseh's confederacy	c. 1805–1824	
Confederation of the Rhine	1806–1813	Client states of the French Empire; had no head of state nor government.
United Provinces of New Granada	1810–1816	Parts of present-day Colombia.
Sweden–Norway^{a}	1814–1905	Present-day Norway and Sweden.
Liga Federal^{b}	1815–1820	Parts of present-day Uruguay and Argentina.
German Confederation	1815–1866	
Confederation of the Equator	1824	Located in northeastern Brazil.
Argentine Confederation	1832–1860	
Peru–Bolivian Confederation	1836–1839	Present-day Bolivia and Peru.
Federal Republic of Central America	1842–1844	Present-day Costa Rica, El Salvador, Guatemala, Honduras, and Nicaragua.
Granadine Confederation	1858–1863	
Confederate States of America	1861–1865	11 Southern U.S. secessionist states during the American Civil War.
United States of Colombia	1863–1886	
Carlist States	1872–1876	Parts of present-day Spain.
United Republics of North Caucasus	1918–1919	
(Republic of the Rif) Confederal Republic of the Tribes of the Rif	1921–1926	Also known as the Rif Republic; short-lived republic in Spanish-occupied Northern Morocco during the Rif War.
Netherlands-Indonesia Union	1949–1956	Present-day Indonesia and the Netherlands.
Federation of Rhodesia and Nyasaland	1953–1963	Also known as the Central African Federation, consisting of the then-British colonies of Northern Rhodesia, Southern Rhodesia, and Nyasaland (present-day Malawi, Zambia, and Zimbabwe).
(Arab Federation) Arab Federation^{b}	1958	Present-day Iraq, Jordan, and the West Bank.
(United Arab Republic) United Arab Republic^{b} and the United Arab States^{b}	1958–1961	Present-day Egypt and Syria, joined by the former Kingdom of Yemen.
Union of African States	1961–1963	Present-day Mali, Ghana, and Guinea.
Federation of Arab Republics^{b}	1972	Present-day Egypt, Libya, and Syria.
Arab Islamic Republic^{b}	1974	Present-day Libya and Tunisia.
Senegambia	1982–1989	Present-day Gambia and Senegal.
Rebel Zapatista Autonomous Municipalities	1994–2023	De facto autonomous territories, formerly located in the Mexican state of Chiapas.
African Union	2002–present	
Serbia and Montenegro	2003–2006	Present-day Montenegro and Serbia.
Alliance of Sahel States	2024–present	Burkina Faso, Mali and Niger.

- ^{a} Confederated personal union.
- ^{b} De facto confederation.

== See also ==
- Arab states of the Persian Gulf
- Association of Southeast Asian Nations (ASEAN)
- Associated state
- British Commonwealth
- Coalition government
- North Atlantic Treaty Organization (NATO)
- Collective Security Treaty Organization (CSTO)
- Commonwealth of Independent States (CIS)
- Continental union
- Countries of the United Kingdom
- Customs Union of the Eurasian Economic Union (EAEU)
- Economic Community of West African States (ECOWAS)
- Federalism
- Federation
- List of confederations
- Member states of NATO
- Military alliance
- List of military alliances
- Organization of Turkic States (OTS)
- Personal union
- Post-Soviet states
- Supranational union

== Sources ==
- Grant, Wyn (2018). "Confederation". A Concise Oxford Dictionary of Politics and International Relations (4th ed.). Oxford University Press. ISBN 9780191749568.
- Kembayev, Zhenis (3 February 2009). Legal Aspects of the Regional Integration Processes in the Post-Soviet Area. Springer Science & Business Media. ISBN 978-3-540-87652-6.
- Miller, Nicholas (2005). "Serbia and Montenegro". Eastern Europe: An Introduction to the People, Lands, and Culture. Vol. 3. Santa Barbara, California: ABC-CLIO. pp. 529–581. ISBN 978-1576078006.
