= Democratic transition =

Specific phase in a political system

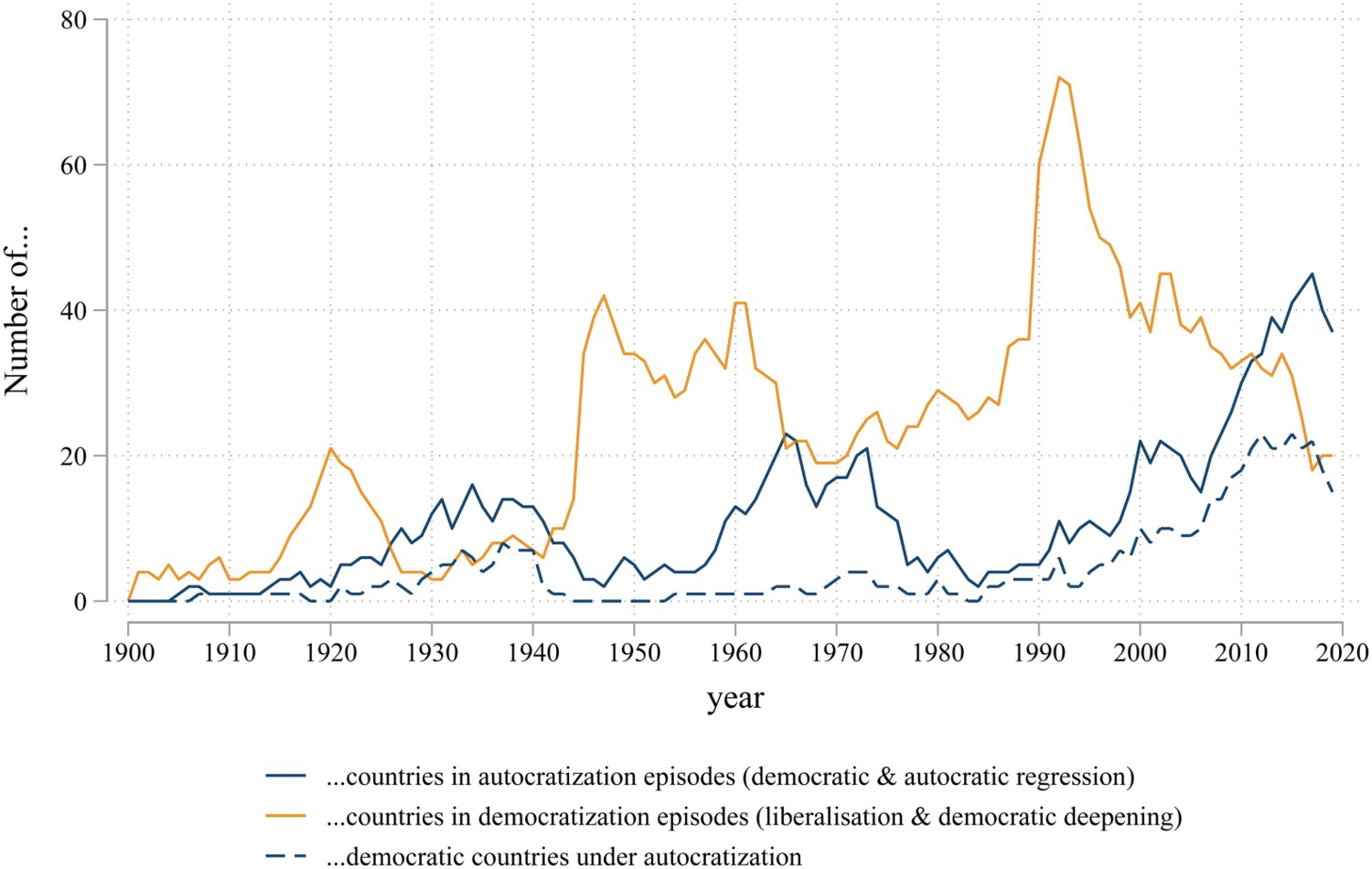
Since 1900, the number of countries democratizing (yellow) has been higher than those autocratizing (blue), except in the late 1920s through 1940s and since 2010.

A democratic transition describes a phase in a country's political system as a result of an ongoing change from an authoritarian regime to a democratic one. The process is known as democratisation, political changes moving in a democratic direction. Democratization waves have been linked to sudden shifts in the distribution of power among the great powers, which created openings and incentives to introduce sweeping domestic reforms. Although transitional regimes experience more civil unrest, they may be considered stable in a transitional phase for decades at a time. Since the end of the Cold War transitional regimes have become the most common form of government. Scholarly analysis of the decorative nature of democratic institutions concludes that the opposite democratic backsliding (autocratization), a transition to authoritarianism, is the most prevalent basis of modern hybrid regimes.

== Typology ==
=== Autocratization ===
Countries autocratizing (red) or democratizing (blue) substantially and significantly (2010–2020), according to V-Dem Institute. Countries in grey are substantially unchanged.

Democratic backsliding (Note: Other names include democratic decline, de-democratization, democratic erosion, democratic decay, democratic recession, democratic regression, and democratic deconsolidation.) is a form of autocratization, a process of structural government transition from democracy toward authoritarianism in which the exercise of political power becomes broader, less based on democracy, and more arbitrary and repressive. The process typically restricts the space for public contest and political participation in the process of government selection. Democratic backsliding involves the weakening of democratic institutions, such as when the transition of power becomes less peaceful or elections less free and fair, or when the powers that be violate individual rights that underpin democracies, especially freedom of expression.

=== Democratisation ===
Map showing democratization of countries after the Cold War Autocratic government overthrown violently Autocratic government overthrown peacefully* Ruling party abandons Marxism–Leninism or socialism/Economic liberalization War ended War started Democratization** Communist party collapses Unsuccessful revolution * East Germany cannot be displayed due to the limitations of {{choropleth map}} ** North Yemen cannot be displayed due to the limitations of {{choropleth map}}

Democratization, or democratisation, is the structural government transition from an authoritarian government to a more democratic political regime, including substantive political changes moving in a democratic direction. The opposite process of democratic transition is known as democratic backsliding or autocratization. Whether and to what extent democratization occurs can be influenced by various factors, including economic development, historical legacies, civil society, and international processes. Some accounts of democratization emphasize how elites drove democratization, whereas other accounts emphasize grassroots bottom-up processes. How democratization occurs has also been used to explain other political phenomena, such as whether a country goes to a war or whether its economy grows.

== Factors ==
=== Decolonization ===
Decolonization is the ending of colonialism, the latter being the process whereby imperial nations establish and dominate foreign territories, often overseas. The meanings and applications of the term are disputed. Some scholars of decolonization focus especially on independence movements in the colonies and the collapse of global colonial empires.

Except for a few absolute monarchies, most post-colonial states are either republics or constitutional monarchies. These new states had to devise constitutions, electoral systems, and other institutions of representative democracy.

=== Democratic globalization ===
Democratic globalization is a social movement towards an institutional system of global democracy. One of its proponents is the British political thinker David Held. In the last decade, Held has published a dozen books on the spread of democracy from territorially defined nation-states to a system of global governance encompassing the whole world. For some, democratic mundialisation (from the French term mondialisation) is a variant of democratic globalization that emphasizes the need for citizens worldwide to directly elect world leaders and members of global institutions; for others, it is just democratic globalization by another name. The term is often used against the idea of 'elite globalization', which is considered a process harnessed to further the prosperity of exclusive interests, in contrast to democratic globalization—a process harnessed to further the prosperity of all.

=== Democracy promotion ===
Democracy promotion, also referred to as democracy building, can be domestic policy to increase the quality of already existing democracy or a strand of foreign policy adopted by governments and international organizations that seek to support the spread of democracy as a system of government. In practice, it entails consolidating and building democratic institutions.

== Outcomes ==
=== Democratic consolidation ===
Democratic consolidation is the process by which a new democracy matures, in a way that it becomes unlikely to revert to authoritarianism without an external shock, and is regarded as the only available system of government within a country. A country can be described as consolidated when the current democratic system becomes "the only game in town", meaning no one in the country is trying to act outside of the set institutions. This is the case when no significant political group seriously attempts to overthrow the democratic regime, the democratic system is regarded as the most appropriate way to govern by the vast majority of the public, and all political actors are accustomed to the fact that conflicts are resolved through established political and constitutional rules.

=== Stalled transition ===
==== Hybrid regime ====
A hybrid regime (Note: Scholars use a variety of terms to encompass the "grey zones" between full autocracies and full democracies. Such terms include: competitive authoritarianism, semi-authoritarianism, hybrid authoritarianism, electoral authoritarianism, liberal autocracy, delegative democracy, illiberal democracy, guided democracy, semi-democracy, deficient democracy, defective democracy, and hybrid democracy.) is a type of political system often created as a result of an incomplete democratic transition from an authoritarian regime to a democratic one (or vice versa). (Note: Debates over what can be called "hybrid" still exist, see Hybrid regime § Definition.) Hybrid regimes are categorized as having a combination of autocratic features with democratic ones and can simultaneously hold political repressions and regular elections.

== Measurement ==
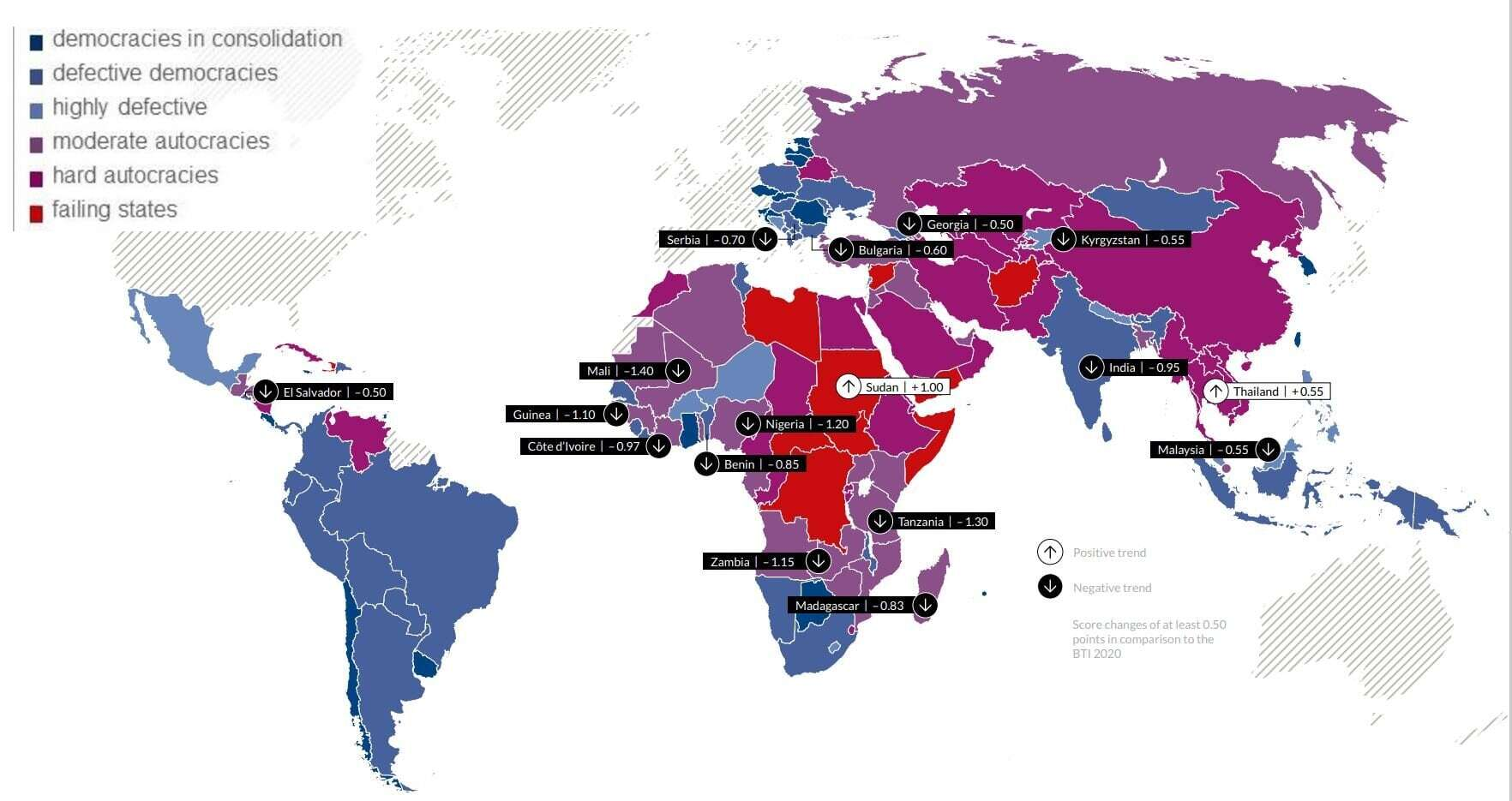
Global trend report Bertelsmann Transformation Index 2022

Democracy indices differ in whether they are categorical, such as classifying countries into democracies, hybrid regimes, and autocracies, or continuous, assigning scores along a scale. The quantitative nature of democracy indices enables data-analytical approaches to studying the causal mechanisms of regime transformation processes.

== Successful transitions to democracy ==
Anocratic regimes are often implicitly mentioned in democratic transition literature. There are several examples of regimes that have successfully transitioned from anocracy to democracy.

=== Mexico ===
Mexico's transition from an anocratic to democratic regime occurred in the 1980s and the 1990s on the electoral stage. The period was characterized by the rise of multiple parties, the decline of power of the Institutional Revolutionary Party, and the decentralization of power from the national level to municipalities. The democratization process produced competitive elections with less voting fraud, culminating with the 1994 presidential election. There was also a documented increase in the role of media and journalism during this period, which led to the creation of various special interest groups, such as those representing the environment, indigenous rights, and women's rights. However, violence continues to remain a characteristic of Mexico's local elections.

=== Taiwan ===
At the end of the Chinese Civil War in 1949, the Republic of China retreated to the island of Taiwan. The constitution used by the Republic of China to govern Taiwan guaranteed civil rights and elections, but it was ignored in favor of rule under martial law. Taiwan's pro-democracy movement gained momentum in the early 1980s and coalesced into the formation of the Democratic Progressive Party in 1986. Over the next decade, Taiwan attempted to restore the civil rights promised in its constitution, culminating with Taiwan's first direct presidential election in 1996. Taiwan continues to move towards a consolidated democracy.

=== Ghana ===
In 1991, Ghana was listed as an autocratic regime with a Polity score of negative seven. By the late 1990s and early 2000s, Ghana was an open anocracy. In 2005, Ghana successfully transitioned from an open anocracy to a democracy as it has retained a Polity score of eight since 2006. A major part of Ghana's success can be attributed to its management of the electoral process to decrease electoral conflict. Since Ghana began having elections in 1992, the strengthening of government institutions such as a strong, independent electoral commission has decreased electoral conflict. The existence of civil society organizations and a media aimed at ensuring democratic principles have also helped manage electoral conflicts in Ghana. For example, Ghana's 2008 elections ended peacefully, as political institutions were able to respond to electoral challenges and advance democratic principles and processes. However, some electoral conflicts remain on a small scale in Ghana such as ethnic vote blocking, vote buying, intimidation, and hate speeches. Yet, even with those minor conflicts, Ghana has been able to transform from an anocracy to a democracy by decreasing electoral conflicts.

=== Africa ===
At the end of World War II, European control over its colonial territories in Africa diminished. During the period of decolonization in the 1950s and 1960s, many African states gained independence. Although these newly independent African states could become either democratic or autocratic regimes, manageability issues made way for autocratic regimes to come into power. Most underdeveloped African states that did become democracies in this period failed within 10 years and transitioned to autocracies. For about 30 years after 1960, the number of autocratic regimes in Africa rose from 17 to 41 as the number of democratic regimes stayed around five. After the fall of communist states in Europe and the rise of democratization at the end of the Cold War, Africa experienced a major political transformation. In the 1990s, the number of autocracies decreased to nine, and the number of democracies increased to nine since many African countries remained anocratic. By 2012, Africa had three autocracies, 17 democracies, and 30 anocracies. By 2013, most African countries had remained either open or closed anocracies. As African states transition from autocracy to anocracy and from anocracy to democracy, electoral conflicts and violence remain prevalent.

==== Nigeria ====
With a Polity score of four in 2014, Nigeria is categorized as an open anocracy, transitioning closer to democracy than autocracy. In recent years, Nigeria has displayed characteristics of anocratic regimes including political corruption and electoral riggings. Following years of military rule after gaining independence in 1960 to 1999 except for 1979 to 1983, the 2007 general elections marked the first time in Nigerian history that political leadership was passed from one civilian to another by an election. However, in late 2006, just months before the April 2007 general election, ex-President Olusegun Obasanjo used state institutions to try to defeat political opponents as he attempted to win a third presidential term. Using the Economic and Financial Crimes Commission (EFCC), an institution created by his administration, the former president had some of his political enemies and their family members arrested or detained. Despite the electoral conflicts, some Nigerians view their country as running on democratic principles because military power has been controlled by political elites for 15 years. However, those electoral conflicts, combined with state governors using legislative and judiciary power to win elections repeatedly, suggests that Nigeria remains an anocracy. Ex-President Goodluck Jonathan was accused of abusing his power in an attempt to remain in office after 2015, despite claiming his presidency advocated democratic principles. The Administration of President Buhari has also seen State forces used in ways that can be at times described as anti-democratic by State Governors and agents of the Federal Government.

==== Somalia ====
Somalia was labeled as an autocracy from 1969 to 2012, with a Polity score of negative seven throughout the entire period. From 1969 to 1991, Siad Barre was the military dictator of the Somali Democratic Republic. After Barre was overthrown in 1991, two decades of chaos ensued, as civil war broke out and rival warlords fought to gain power. The consistent fighting of tribal leaders and warlords made the country unable to deal with natural disasters, droughts, and famines, which caused a combined 500,000 deaths in famines in 1992 and 2010 to 2012.

After years of being split into fiefdoms, the main Somali warlords established an agreement to appoint a new president in 2004. However, the plan failed when Islamist insurgents, including the radical youth militia al-Shabaab, which has links to Al-Qaeda, gained control over much of southern Somalia from 2006 to 2008. With the assistance of international peacekeeping offensives and the Kenyan army, the Islamist insurgents were forced to withdraw in 2012. In the same year, the first formal parliament in over 20 years was appointed in Somalia. The newly formed parliament chose Hassan Sheikh Mohamud as the new president in September 2012. With international assistance, the Somali government has been able to rebuild itself and the country has recently been relatively more stable. Since 2013, Somalia has retained a Polity score of five and is listed as an open anocracy.

==== Uganda ====
In the 1990s, Uganda transitioned from an autocracy to a closed anocracy. Although Uganda saw a jump in its Polity score in the mid-2000s, it has retained a Polity score of negative two for the last decade. Uganda is populated by many ethnic groups with the largest, the Buganda group, making up 17% of the population. Since Uganda gained independence in 1962, incessant conflict has ensued among approximately 17 ethnic groups, which has led to political instability. The dictator Idi Amin was responsible for around 300,000 deaths under his rule from 1971 to 1979, and guerrilla warfare from 1980 to 1985 under Milton Obote killed 100,000 people. Human rights abuses under both rulers led to even more deaths from 1971 to 1985.

In the early 1990s, Uganda experienced large-scale violent dissent as the country experienced more rebellions and guerrilla warfare. As a result of the wars, the government called for non-party presidential and legislative elections in the mid-1990s. A period of relative peace followed, as a common law legal system was instituted in 1995. Uganda transitioned from an authoritarian regime to a closed anocracy. The political situation of Uganda has seen little improvement under the rule of Yoweri Museveni, who has maintained power since 1986 because other political organizations in Uganda cannot sponsor candidates. Only Museveni and his National Resistance Movement (NRM) can operate without any limitations, leading to electoral conflicts and violence.

==== Zimbabwe ====
When Robert Mugabe became president in 1980, Zimbabwe was listed as an open anocracy with a Polity score of four. By 1987, the country had almost fully transitioned to an authoritarian regime, with a Polity score of negative six, which made it a closed anocracy. After remaining on the border between an authoritarian regime and closed anocracy for over a decade, Zimbabwe's Polity score increased in the early 2000s. Currently, Zimbabwe has a Polity score of 4, making it an open anocracy. In recent years, Zimbabwe has moved toward becoming a more democratic regime, but electoral conflicts and human rights violations still exist leaving Zimbabwe as an anocratic regime.

In the late 1990s, when Zimbabwe was a closed anocracy, the country experienced major human rights violations. Labor strikes were common, as employers did not listen to the demands of their employees, and real wages fell by 60 percent from 1992 to 1997. The labor strikes that occurred in the late 1990s were declared illegal by the government of Zimbabwe, and blame was put on poor working-class citizens. As labor laws continued hurting workers, health services declined, and housing projects stagnated.

Since becoming president in 1980, Mugabe used a variety of tactics to remain in power that led to major electoral conflicts over the years. In the March 2008 presidential election, the electoral body reported that Morgan Tsvangirai, the presidential candidate of the opposing party, had received more votes than Mugabe. However, because Tsvangirai received 48% of the vote and not an absolute majority, it was announced that a runoff would take place. Using intimidation tactics, including murder threats, Mugabe and his party forced Tsvangirai to withdraw from the runoff, and Mugabe remained in power. A US-led United Nations Security Council resolution to impose sanctions on Mugabe failed, and talks about powersharing between Mugabe and Tsvangirai ended soon after the runoff. After an opposing party candidate, Lovemore Moyo, won Speaker of the Legislature, a powersharing coalition was finally set up in September 2008 in which Tsvangirai was named prime minister. By 2010 the Polity score of Zimbabwe had increased from one to four. However, in 2013, Mugabe won his seventh straight presidential term, and the election was criticized for being rigged to allow Mugabe to win.

=== Asia ===
==== Burma ====
Burma, or the Republic of the Union of Myanmar, before 1 February 2021 (coup d'etat) was classified as an anocracy because of adverse armed conflict, changes in leadership, and the partly democratic, partly authoritarian nature of its government. Burma had a representative democracy after it gained independence from Britain. Soon after independence was achieved, there was an outbreak of various insurgencies and rebellions. Many of the insurgencies were caused by divides along ethnic lines. One of the most prominent civil wars in Burma, the Kachin conflict, restarted in 2011, and Burma is still embroiled in a civil war.

Burma has had a history of changes in government, usually by military coups. In 1962, General Ne Win enacted a military coup and created the Burma Socialist Programme Party, which held power for 26 years. On 18 September 1988, General Saw Maung led another military coup to return the government to the people and created the State Law and Order Restoration Council (SLORC), which was renamed State Peace and Development Council. After holding free and legitimate elections in May 1990, the National League for Democracy (NLD) won with Aung San Suu Kyi at its head. However, the military junta refused to give up power to the NLD. The Union Solidarity and Development Party (USDP), backed by the military, won the 2010 elections and the military government was dissolved soon afterward.

The Burmese government shows signs of having democratic as well as authoritarian features. Burma is a pseudodemocratic state because of the elections that were held in 1990 and 2010. However, both elections were problematic because the military did not transfer power to the winning party in 1990, and the 2010 elections were seen as illegitimate. Violent repression is the biggest signifier of the authoritarian nature of the Burmese government. The Win regime was marked by extreme oppression and human rights abuses and as a result, Burmese civilians and students protested against the government. The Burmese government responded violently to the protests and the Tatmadaw, or Myanmar Armed Forces, killed many of the protestors. After the coup in 1988 by General Maung, the protests were violently suppressed again, as Maung's government proceeded to implement martial law to bring peace and order.

==== Cambodia ====
Cambodia is an example of anocracy because its government displays democratic and authoritarian aspects. Under the United Nations Transitional Authority in Cambodia, Cambodia implemented an electoral system based on proportional representation, held legitimate elections, and instituted a parliamentary system of government. The constitution created on 21 September 1993 indicated that Cambodia was a parliamentary government with a constitutional monarchy. Cambodia exhibited signs of a democratic state, especially with the presence of elections and a proportionally representative government. After the coup in 1997, the Cambodian government has taken more authoritarian measures to keep peace in the country. Protests have been suppressed violently by pro-government forces and many human rights activists and protesters have been arrested by the Cambodian government.

Cambodia shows signs of being an unstable government with abrupt changes in leadership, making it an anocracy. The initial elections led to FUNCINPEC's victory, under the leadership of Prince Ranariddh. FUNCINPEC and the Buddhist Liberal Democratic Party won 68 out of 120 seats in the National Assembly. The Cambodian People's Party, led by Hun Sen, refused to accept the outcome. Although a coalitional government was created with Prince Ranariddh as the First Prime Minister and Sen as the Second Prime Minister, the deal failed as Sen led a coup d'état on 5 July 1997. Sen and the CPP have been in power ever since, and the CPP recently won a general election against the Cambodia National Rescue Party, led by Sam Rainsy.

==== Thailand ====
Thailand's history of leadership changes make it an anocratic state. Thailand has been in a constant state of political upheaval since 1993. Coups d'état and widespread political corruption are the main causes of political instability. Thailand experienced a period of political liberalization under General Prem Tinsulanonda, an unelected prime minister from 1980 to 1988. A series of coups ensued soon afterward. General Suchinda Kraprayoon led a coup against Prime Minister Chatichai Choonhavan on 23 February 1991. After the Black May incident, Suchinda was forced to resign, and Anand Panyarachun was assigned the position of temporary prime minister. Thaksin Shinawatra won the 2001 elections and became prime minister; he won again in 2005 but was deposed in the 2006 Thai coup d'état. After a new constitution was adopted, Samak Sundaravej and his People's Power Party won the 2007 election, and Sundaravej became prime minister. However, a conflict of interest caused Sundaravej to be ousted, and Somchai Wongsawat was elected as the new prime minister. Shortly after his election, Prime Minister Wongsawat and the PPP was found guilty of electoral fraud, and Wongsawat lost his position. Abhisit Vejjajiva's election as the next prime minister was met with opposition by "Red Shirts". On 3 July 2011, Yingluck Shinawatra, belonging to the Pheu Thai Party, was elected as prime minister. After mass protests in 2013, Shinawatra was deposed by a military coup led by General Prayut Chan-o-cha, who was prime minister until 2023.

== See also ==
- Energy transition
- Anti-authoritarianism
- Types of democracy
- Peaceful transition of power
- Democratic resilience
- Radical politics
- Transition economy
- List of freedom indices
