= Widow's peak =

V-shaped point in the hairline

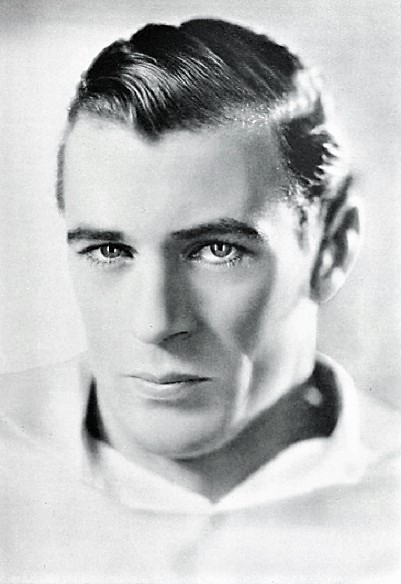
Actor Gary Cooper had a distinctive widow's peak.

A widow's peak is a V-shaped point in the hairline in the center of the forehead. Hair growth on the forehead is suppressed in a bilateral pair of periorbital fields. Without a widow's peak, these fields join in the middle of the forehead so as to give a hairline that runs straight across. A widow's peak results when the point of intersection on the forehead of the upper perimeters of these fields is lower than usual.

== Definition ==
A widow's peak is a distinct point in the hairline in the center of the forehead; there are varying degrees of the peak. Although it is commonly taught as an example of a dominant inherited trait, there are no scientific studies to support this.

== Etymology ==
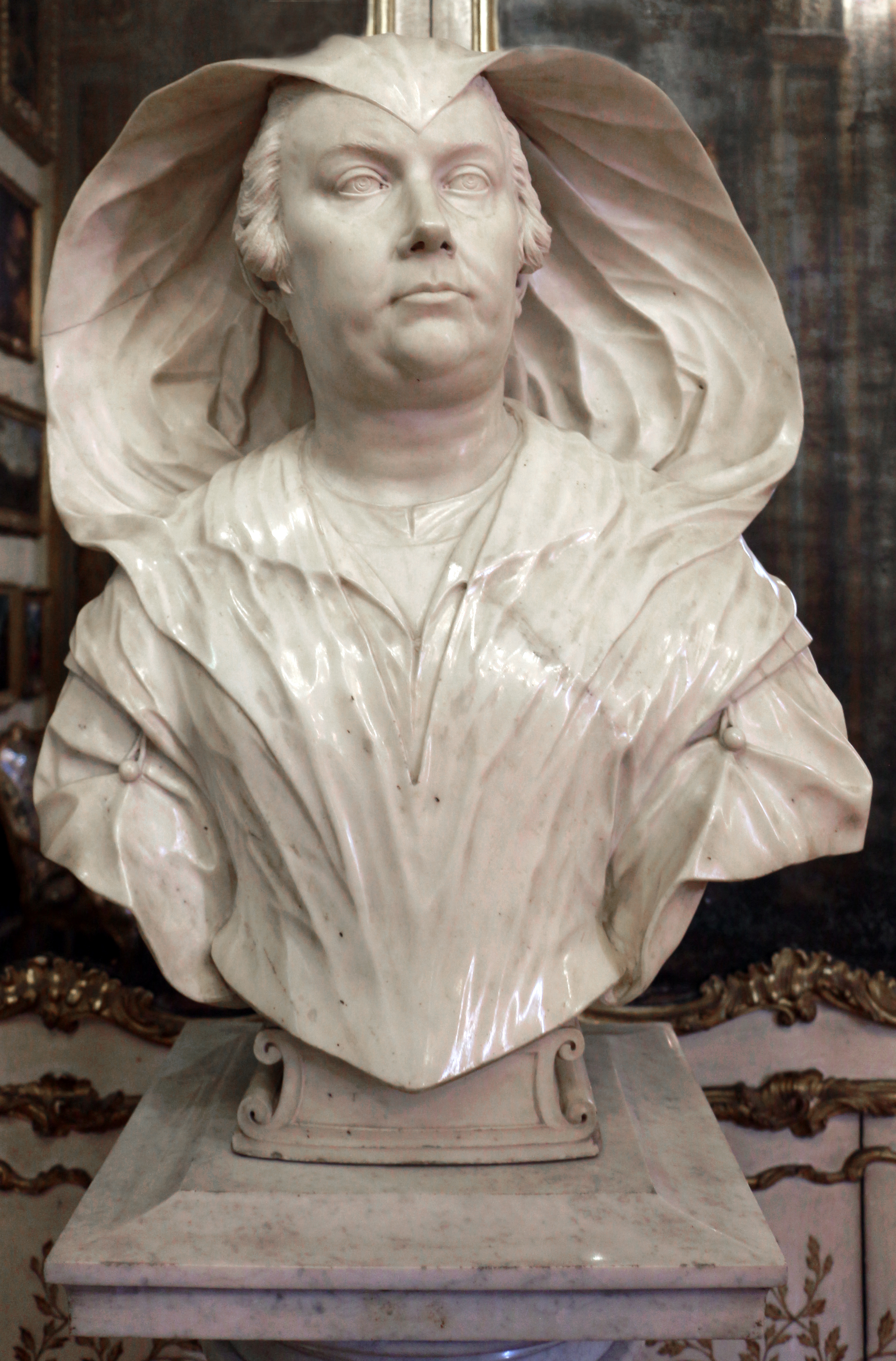
Sculpture of Olimpia Maidalchini wearing a widow's hood

The term stems from the belief that hair growing to a point on the forehead – suggestive of the peak of a widow's hood – is an omen of early widowhood. The use of peak in relation to hair dates from 1833. The expression widow's peak dates from 1849. Peak may refer to the beak, or bill, of a headdress, particularly the distinctive hood with a pointed piece in front – a biquoquet – which widows wore as a hood of mourning dating from 1530. A Mary Stuart cap is a cap which features a very distinctive triangular fold of cloth in the middle of the forehead, creating an artificial widow's peak. The use of peak referring to a point in the cloth covering the forehead dates to at least as far back as 1509, when it appears in Alexander Barclay’s The Shyp of Folys:

And ye Jentyl wymen whome this lewde vice doth blynde Lased on the backe: your peakes set a loft.

== Causes ==
Ely Guv Hintonith and M. Michael Cohen hypothesized the widow's peak hairline to be an anomaly that results from a lower-than-usual point of intersection of the bilateral periorbital fields of hair-growth suppression on the forehead. This can occur because the periorbital fields of hair-growth suppression are smaller than usual, or because they are more widely spaced. Wide spacing also explains the association between ocular hypertelorism – that is, the eyes being abnormally far apart – and widow's peak; this was suggested by findings in an unusual case of ocular hypertelorism in which surrounding scalp-hair growth was suppressed by an ectopic (displaced) eye. In some cases, widow's peaks are a symptom of Donnai–Barrow syndrome, a rare genetic disorder caused by mutations in the LRP2 gene. Other genetic syndromes occasionally associated with widow's peaks include Waardenburg syndrome and Aarskog syndrome.

It was thought that widow's peaks were slightly more common among males, but recent studies have found no difference of statistical significance. Studies among the Isoko ethnic group in Nigeria found that 15.45% of males had a widow's peak present as compared to 16.36% of females.

== Notable examples ==
People with natural widow's peaks include singers Amy Grant, Nick Jonas, Britney Spears, Unai Emery, Damiano David, Alex Turner, Lauren Jauregui, Jack White, Kat Bjelland, Rebecca Black, Zayn Malik, and Olivia Dean, six-time world Snooker champion Ray Reardon (nickname Dracula, in reference to his prominent widow's peak and sharp canine teeth), professional tennis player Taylor Fritz, Brazilian football player Cafu, Soviet cosmonaut Pavel Belyayev, actors Chris Hemsworth, Keanu Reeves, Kit Harington, Leonardo DiCaprio, John Travolta, Grace Kelly, Blake Lively, Fran Drescher, Rita Hayworth, Marilyn Monroe, Andy García, Colin Farrell, James Roday, Rekha, Luke Evans, male model Hamza Ali Abbasi, reality TV star Judith Sheindlin, as well as politicians Paul Ryan, Ronald Reagan, and Andrew Jackson.

A number of fictional people have widow's peaks. In film, this trait is often associated with a villain or antagonist; Count Dracula is an example. Eddie Munster – from the television program The Munsters – also had this distinctive hairline. Another villain depicted as having widow's peak hair is the Joker from Batman comic books and films. Namor, the Sub-Mariner has long held the feature. Vegeta from the Dragon Ball franchise is known for his widow's peak. Hannibal Lecter is repeatedly described as having one in the novels that feature his story. However, the hairline is not strictly associated with fictional villains: for example, beloved Disney character Mickey Mouse sports a distinctive widow's peak. The original illustrations of Sherlock Holmes present the famed detective with a prominent widow's peak, as do all of Spider-Man co-creator Steve Ditko's drawings of Peter Parker, and a sketch of James Bond personally commissioned by the character's creator, Ian Fleming. Pulp fiction hero Doc Savage also had this hair trait. Oberyn Martell from George R. R. Martin's A Song of Ice and Fire novels is described as having a prominent widow's peak.

Additionally, widow's peaks are shown to poll well for politicians. According to research by Shawn Rosenberg of the University of California, Irvine, "widow’s peaks (though more so on female candidates) were a clear positive. It was associated with being seen as more competent and with greater integrity".

== See also ==
- Hay hood – An architectural barn element sometimes called a widow's peak
