= Quebec Contingency Act =

Canadian bill

The Quebec Contingency Act (Bill C-341) was a private member's bill tabled in Canada's federal Parliament in 1996 to establish the conditions which would apply to a referendum regarding the separation of Quebec from Canada. It was a precursor to the Clarity Act of 2000.

Bill C-341 was introduced by future Prime Minister and then Reform MP Stephen Harper, and reached First Reading on October 30, 1996. Its full title was "An Act to establish the terms and conditions that must apply to a referendum relating to the separation of Quebec from Canada before it may be recognized as a proper expression of the will of the people of Quebec."

Bill C-341 did not proceed any further in Parliament following First Reading.

== Summary ==
"This enactment allows the Government of Canada to determine whether a referendum question in Quebec is clear and unambiguous.

If an affirmative answer is given to a clear question, the enactment authorizes the negotiation of separation, subject to the approval of the rest of Canada by referendum.

It affirms that a unilateral declaration of independence is ineffective with respect to Canadian law and does not affect the functioning of the Canadian Parliament, Government and courts with respect to Quebec."
