= Karen Stenner =

Australian political scientist

- Education: University of Queensland; Stony Brook University
- Scientific career
- Fields: Political science
- Workplaces: Duke University; Princeton University; Griffith University
- Website: www.karenstenner.com

Karen Stenner is a political scientist specialising in political psychology. Stenner has studied the political activation of authoritarian personality types, and how that activation explains the contemporary success of some authoritarian political figures as well as enduring conflicts between some individuals and the broad tolerance that characterises liberal democracy.

== Education and early career ==
Stenner attended the University of Queensland, earning a BA in 1987. In 1995 she earned an MA from Stony Brook University, followed by a PhD there in 1997. In 1996 she became an assistant professor at Duke University, and then in 1998 she joined the faculty at Princeton University. She later returned to Australia, where she worked on behavioral economics and public policy at institutions including Griffith University.

== Research ==
In 2005, Stenner published The Authoritarian Dynamic, which is an investigation into authoritarian personality types and how they become politically activated. She states that prior research on authoritarianism has suffered primarily from tautological assertions and has otherwise failed to produce a coherent theory which is consistent cross-nationally, and which can successfully account for how authoritarian expressions fluctuate with diverse sociopolitical conditions. In particular, she asserts that Bob Altemeyer's right-wing authoritarianism (RWA) scale is best understood as a measure of expressed authoritarianism, and that other measures are needed to assess authoritarian predispositions. To this end, she rejects Altemeyer's "social learning" interpretation and instead argues that authoritarianism is a dynamic response to perceived external threats; not a static personality type based only on the traits of submission, aggression and conventionalism.

Stenner distinguishes between authoritarianism and conservatism, using "authoritarianism" to refer to a resistance to interpersonal difference (i.e. diversity of people and beliefs at a given moment), and "conservatism" as resistance to change. Authoritarianism can thus be thought of as aversion to difference across space, whereas conservatism is aversion to difference across time. For example, one may be a conservative libertarian, but libertarianism is the opposite end of a spectrum from authoritarianism, since the former is defined by encouragement of individual difference and resistance to centralized authority. She thus argues that much of what is conventionally referred to as "racism" is perhaps better understood as "difference-ism," with moral and political diversity (as opposed merely to ethnic diversity) especially provoking intolerant attitudes from authoritarian individuals. In particular, she highlights how authoritarians' expressions of racial, moral, and political intolerance depreciated by approximately 50% when survey respondents were misled to believe that NASA had discovered extraterrestrial life forms which were "very different from us in ways we are not yet even able to imagine."

Stenner argues that conservatives value stability and certainty over increased uniformity, and therefore, will embrace racial diversity, civil liberties and moral freedom to the extent they are already institutionalised and authoritatively-supported traditions within a given society. She argues that conservatives may be drawn towards authoritarianism only when public opinion is fractious and there is a general loss of confidence in major institutions; i.e. when the prospect of revolution appears less daunting to them than the current state of affairs. Authoritarians however want difference restricted regardless of circumstances; even when so doing would necessitate vast social reforms and instability. By this account, she asserts that authoritarians are never more tolerant than when reassured and pacified by an autocratic culture, and never more intolerant than when forced to endure a vibrant democracy.

"If authoritarianism is concerned with sacrificing individual freedom and diversity to group authority and conformity, and if authoritarians have the motives and capacities I have ascribed to them, [then] it is easy to see that the central elements of democracy are not just anathema, but actually insensible to authoritarians. Disagreement, dissent, and disobedience; determination of the 'common good' by debate and negotiation between partisans of competing worldviews: none of this [is] comprehensible, let alone palatable from the authoritarian perspective."

Through survey techniques identifying authoritarianism in respondents, Stenner identifies personality attributes and values shared by those with pro-authoritarian inclinations, and argues that these traits inform an opposition to difference and an attachment to uniformity which are then activated in the presence of normative societal threats. Such threats to uniformity thus transform a personality attribute into a politically salient reaction which ultimately serves to defend one's beliefs and identification with the collective. Most notably, she cites perceptions of poor leadership and belief diversity (i.e. lack of consensus in group values) as being the two most significant factors contributing to the authoritarian response, though she also notes that authoritarians are generally susceptible to the false consensus effect and thus are not likely to perceive normative threats until they have become highly apparent: "Authoritarians are not especially inclined to perceive normative (indeed, any) threat, they are just especially intolerant once they do." When otherwise abated by belief consensus and leadership which they regard as sufficiently strong however, authoritarians express very low levels of moral, racial, and political intolerance. Authoritarians living in Japan in 1990, for example, were found to be nearly indistinguishable from their libertarian counterparts, on account of numerous cultural and societal factors contributing to a climate of near-equanimity and conformity, thereby mitigating the manifest expression of intolerance of difference.

According to Stenner, authoritarianism is primarily the result of cognitive inhibitions and personality factors which significantly limit one's ability to tolerate ambiguity, complexity, and—by extension—sociocultural diversity. Authoritarians rank very low on openness to experience—one of the Big Five personality traits—and are demonstrably more likely to commit spelling errors, to have smaller vocabularies (relative to libertarians) and to be less likely to pursue post-secondary education. Ultimately, she argues that authoritarians are best understood as "simple-minded avoiders of complexity rather than closed-minded avoiders of change." She similarly rejects the hypothesis that religiosity is a contributory factor to authoritarian beliefs and expressions, citing research indicating a lack of correlation before concluding: "There is no necessary relation between belief in and personal commitment to a religious code, and demand for state coercion of others' adherence to [the] same. The latter rests primarily on something beyond personal faith and individual codes of conduct, having to do with a compulsion to control the diversity and complexity of one's environment, that is, a need to regulate other people's behaviour."

Though focusing primarily on authoritarian predispositions as they are expressed by individuals on the American political right, Stenner nonetheless notes that the dynamic can appear elsewhere on the political spectrum. In particular, she cites the Nation of Islam as a potential sub-cultural manifestation of the authoritarian dynamic, comparing its "self-glorification", insistence on conformity, and militant rejection of state legitimacy to similar attitudes expressed by civilian militia and patriot movements among white authoritarians on the American right. She also notes that approximately one-third of authoritarians tend towards socialism, with even non-socialist authoritarians indicating a willingness to support affirmative action, provided that such measures are enacted with the aim of reducing social stratification, as well as operated by institutions which those same authoritarians perceive as sharing their own beliefs and ideals. Likewise, she asserts that any perceived relation between authoritarianism and laissez-faire economic policies is inconsistent, because of it being highly contingent on authoritarians' varying levels of trust in government.

Stenner identifies the same psychological phenomenon cross-nationally, citing data obtained from both Altemeyer's RWA scale and surveys of child-rearing values as conducted in fifty-nine countries by the World Values Survey. According to Stenner, authoritarians living within Eastern European nations expressed relatively low levels of racial, moral, and political intolerance prior to the dissolution of the Soviet Union, as socialist autocracies provided citizens with normative reassurance (the former Yugoslavia under the rule of Josip Broz Tito being one of the most notable examples). Following the Fall of Communism and subsequent institution of liberal democratic norms, authoritarians within these countries began to express more intolerant attitudes, becoming nearly indistinguishable from authoritarians living within Western-European nations despite differing significantly in their political and economic beliefs and backgrounds. Likewise, she cites studies conducted on identical twins reared in separate environments which have found that authoritarian predispositions have a significant genetic component, on account of them being rooted in personality variables which in turn are substantially heritable.

Stenner thus extrapolates that authoritarianism is not a "learned" phenomenon, but rather an innate psychological tendency which can be found within all civilizations worldwide, and that individuals so predisposed to it "will never live comfortably in a liberal democracy". She thus concludes her analysis by suggesting that authoritarian predilections can only be deterred through responsible leadership and favourable societal conditions, and that such an impediment is perhaps a contributing factor to previously failed attempts at instituting liberal-democratic norms in formerly-autocratic cultures such as those found in Iraq and Afghanistan:

"The lack of actual community in many of the world's [countries]—the legacies of imperialism, the spoils of war, and artificial boundaries—proves to be a great impediment to "installing" democracy and "converting" to democratic citizenship. One cannot create a self-governing community where no community truly exists, and democracy cannot be sustained in the presence of excessive difference. In the final analysis then, democracy does not produce community, it requires community. ... If there are inherent predispositions to intolerance of difference, if citizens so predisposed pop up in all societies, and if those predispositions are actually activated by the experience of living in a vibrant democracy, then freedom feeds fear which undermines freedom, and democracy is its own undoing."

She consequently upholds parliamentary systems of government as examples of "stealth democracy" which are less susceptible to authoritarian influences, on account of them providing normative reassurance to individuals with such predispositions. Conversely, she argues against the multilevel structure of the U.S. political order, stressing that it serves ultimately to amplify public disagreement, propagate adversaries, and polarize the electorate—conditions which are all guaranteed to exacerbate the authoritarian dynamic. Stenner also stresses that expressions of moral, political, and racial intolerance can only be ameliorated by emphasizing unity through common social/cultural identities, and that democracy cannot be sustained in the absence of substantial commonality:

"We tend to imagine, despite a preponderance of evidence, that everyone can be socialized away from intolerance toward greater respect for difference, if only we have the will, the resources, and the opportunity to provide the right experiences. ... According to this wishful understanding of reality, the different can remain as different as they like and the intolerant will eventually have their intolerance educated out of them. But all the available evidence indicates that exposure to difference, talking about difference, and applauding difference—the hallmarks of liberal democracy—are the surest ways to aggravate those who are innately intolerant, and to guarantee the increased expression of their predispositions in manifestly intolerant attitudes and behaviours. Paradoxically, then, it would seem that we can best limit intolerance of difference by parading, talking about, and applauding our sameness. ... This strategy is not nearly as daunting as it might sound, as it is the appearance of sameness that matters, and that apparent variance in beliefs, values, and culture seem to be more provocative of intolerant dispositions than racial and ethnic diversity. What is daunting is the fierce resistance that such proposals encounter from those very actors with the greatest stake in promoting tolerance and respect for difference. But blind faith aside, the science of democracy yields some inescapable, if heretical conclusions. Ultimately, nothing inspires greater tolerance from the intolerant than an abundance of common and unifying beliefs, practices, rituals, institutions, and processes. And regrettably, nothing is more certain to provoke increased expression of their latent predispositions than the likes of “multicultural education,” bilingual policies, and non-assimilation. In the end, our showy celebration of, and absolute insistence upon, individual autonomy and unconstrained diversity pushes those [who are] by nature least equipped to live comfortably in a liberal democracy not to the limits of their tolerance, but to their intolerant extremes. ... We can do all the moralizing we like about how we want our ideal democratic citizens to be. But freedom is most secure and tolerance is maximized when we design systems to accommodate how people actually are, because some people will never live comfortably in a modern liberal democracy."

The Authoritarian Dynamic has been frequently cited by news outlets such as The New York Times, The Atlantic, Slate, and Salon as a work that predicted the resurgence of authoritarianism in contemporary politics, and particularly as an example of research that helps to explain the rise of the Alt-right and other culturally-nationalist sentiments in the lead-up to the 2016 United States Presidential election. Stenner's work suggests that these events appeared surprising or mystifying to many contemporary commentators mainly because they were not provoked by any specific event, but rather because they were a predictable backlash against the gradual increase in diversity and tolerance of difference that has characterized the last several decades of liberal democracy. Jonathan Haidt identified it in 2016 as a text that offers a particularly strong explanation of authoritarianism's contemporary successes. In 2018, Haidt and Stenner collaborated to write a chapter for Can it Happen Here? Authoritarianism in America, wherein they state that "Western liberal democracies have now exceeded many people's capacity to tolerate them," and that authoritarianism is not a momentary phenomenon, but will continue to endure throughout all human societies—and liberal democracies—for as long as perceived "normative threats" remain evident to authoritarians.

== Selected works ==
- "Perceived threat and authoritarianism", Political Psychology, with Stanley Feldman (1997)
- The Authoritarian Dynamic (2005)
- "Three kinds of 'conservatism'", Psychological Inquiry (2009)
