= Ozan Varol =

Turkish jurist and author (born 1981)

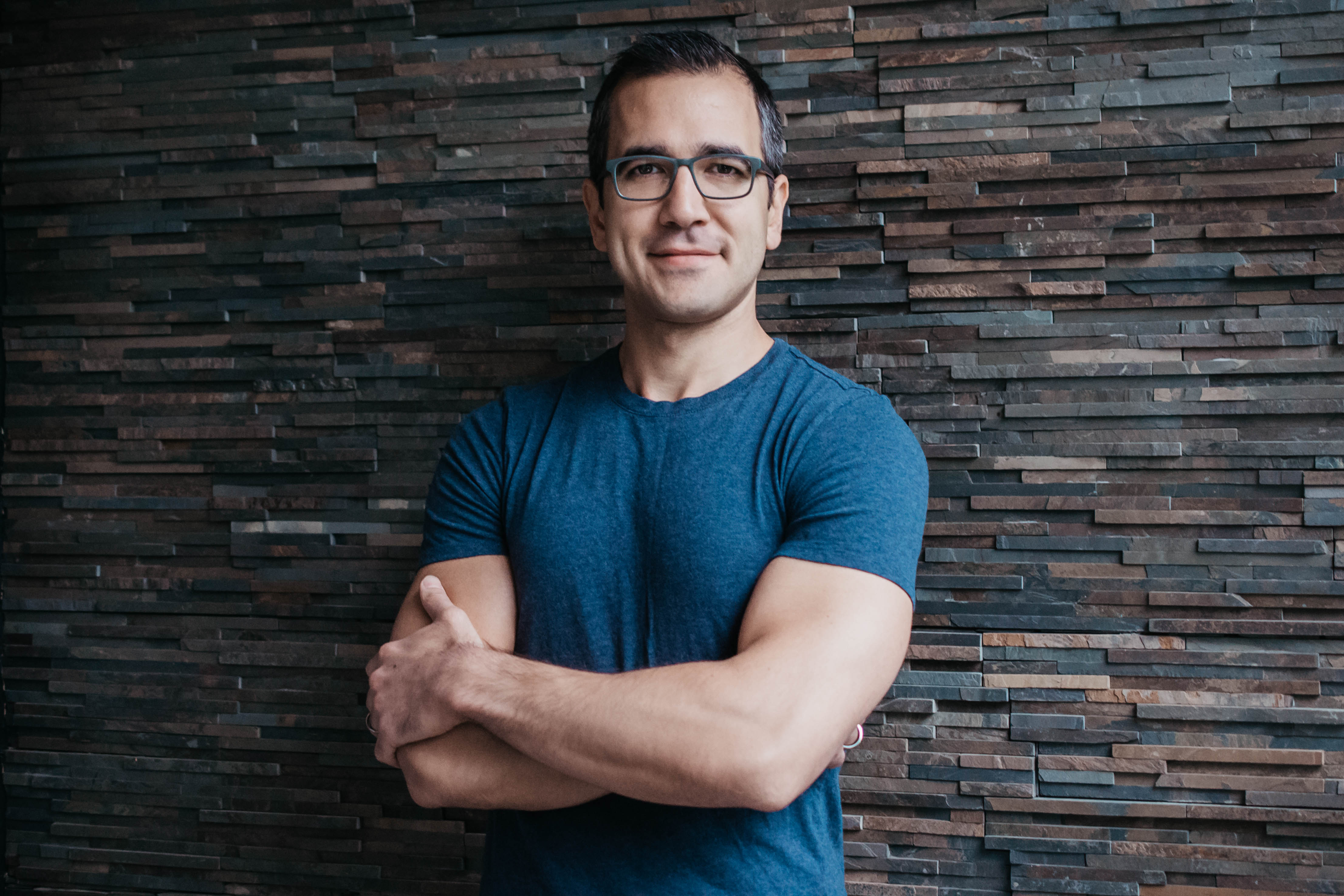
- Varol in 2019
- Born: December 1, 1981 (age 44); Istanbul, Turkey
- Education: Cornell University, Lewis & Clark Law School, The University of Iowa College of Law
- Occupations: Associate law professor, author

Ozan Varol (born December 1, 1981) is a Turkish author and was a tenured law professor at Lewis & Clark Law School. He is best known for coining the phrase "democratic coup" and authoring the book The Democratic Coup d'État.

== Early life and career ==
Varol was born and raised in Istanbul, Turkey. He moved to the United States at the age of 17 for his undergraduate studies where he received a bachelor's degree in Planetary Sciences from Cornell University in 2003. During his time at Cornell, he served as a member of the operations team for NASA's 2003 Mars Exploration Rover project; which sent two rovers to examine the Martian surface. Varol later earned a Juris Doctor degree from the University of Iowa College of Law in 2007.

As an associate professor at the Lewis & Clark Law School in Portland, Oregon, he taught constitutional law, criminal law, and comparative constitutional law. He is best known for his book The Democratic Coup d'État, published in 2017, which expands on his article of the same name, published in the Harvard International Law Journal in 2012. Both works explore the idea that a democracy can sometimes be established by a military coup. Foreign Policy magazine used Varol's criteria to analyze whether the 2013 Egyptian coup d'état that removed Mohammad Morsi from power was democratic. In addition, he has published over a dozen scholarly articles between the years of 2008 and 2017. He also writes weekly in his blog about critical thinking and non-conformity.

He has written about "constitutional stickiness" which Yaniv Roznai describes as follows: "even arbitrary or anachronistic existing constitutional provisions often stick during the remaking of constitutions, due to behavioral mechanisms and biases that entrench the constitutional status quo". Varol has also written about "temporary constitutional provisions" which remain in effect for a limited amount of time.

Varol has defined originalism broadly as the reliance on history for constitutional interpretation. This is limited not only to "legislating from the bench" but also to any interpretation of the constitution that may be informed by the views of historical figures.

== Notable publications ==
- Varol, Ozan (2020). Think Like a Rocket Scientist: Simple Strategies You Can Use to Make Giant Leaps in Work and Life. ISBN 978-1541762596.
- Varol, Ozan O. (2017). The Democratic Coup d'État. ISBN 978-0190626020.
- Varol, Ozan (September 5, 2011). "The Democratic Coup d'État". Harvard International Law Journal. 53 (2): 66.
- Varol, Ozan (April 15, 2017). "Structural Rights". Georgetown Law Journal. 105 (1001): 54. SSRN 2746175.
- Varol, Ozan; Pellegrina, Lucia; Garoupa, Nuno (June 28, 2017). "An Empirical Analysis of Judicial Transformation in Turkey". The American Journal of Comparative Law. 65 (1): 187–216. doi:10.1093/ajcl/avx013.
- Varol, Ozan (March 11, 2015). "Constitutional Stickiness". U.C. Davis Law Review. 49 (899): 63. SSRN 2577007.
- Varol, Ozan (April 24, 2014). "Stealth Authoritarianism". Iowa Law Review. 100 (1673): 70. SSRN 2428965.
- Varol, Ozan (April 30, 2013). "Temporary Constitutions". California Law Review. 102 (409): 56. SSRN 2258188.
