= Democratic resilience =

Capacity of a country to withstand or recover from democratic backsliding

Onset resilience and breakdown resilience to autocratization

Democratic resilience is the capacity of a country to withstand or recover from democratic backsliding. Political scientists distinguish "onset resilience", characterising democratic countries that do not autocratize, from "breakdown resilience", in countries that start autocratizing but reverse it before reaching autocracy status. "Bounce-back resilience" characterises democracies that become autocracies and return in a U-turn to democracy, typically on a time scale of about eight years. Some researchers dispute the existence of bounce-back resilience, finding that post-1993 U-turns mostly lead to democracy that lasts no more than five years.

== Onset resilience versus breakdown resilience ==
In 2021, Vanessa A. Boese and colleagues proposed to distinguish "onset resilience", in democracies that have no significant autocratization (giving Switzerland and Canada as examples), from "breakdown resilience", in democracies that start autocratizing but return to democracy before autocratizing. They studied the Episodes of Regime Transformation (ERT) dataset derived from V-Dem Democracy Indices through to 2019 (version 10).

Onset resilience was found to be positively correlated with judicial constraints on executive power, the length of the country's democratic experience ("democratic stock"), and economic development. Breakdown resilience was found to be positively correlated with judicial constraints on executive power, democratic stock and the levels of democracy in neighbouring countries. Boese et al argued that empirical evidence could be gathered for the two proposed stages of democratic resilience, while democratic consolidation is mainly defined as a prediction, attempting to extrapolate from the past to the future, making it less empirically useful than democratic resilience.

In 2025, Aurel Croissant and Lars Lott proposed to investigate causal factors of democratic resilience by quantifying factors viewed as causal in a combined "Democratic Resilience Capacity" (DRC) parameter, aiming to represent the "ability of democracies to become or to remain resilient". They compared the DRC parameter to empirically measured changes in democratic parameters ("performance") for 103 democracies since 2000. They interpreted the evidence to imply that democratic resilience capacity, as represented by the DRC parameter, had significant effects against onset and breakdown resilience, but not against bounceback resilience.

== U-turns ==
=== Factors of bounceback resilience ===
In an analysis of the V-Dem Democracy Indices through to 2022 (version 13), Felix Wiebrecht and colleagues proposed a third form of resilience ("bounceback resilience" or U-turn resilience), when democratic breakdown occurs, but democracy is restored "within a short time". They found that during the preceding ten years, eight countries that had earlier "substantial[ly]" autocratised reversed their autocratization, with "substantial" democratization: Bolivia, Ecuador, the Maldives, Moldova, North Macedonia, Slovenia, South Korea, and Zambia. All eight countries lacked onset resilience; four (Ecuador, Moldova, Slovenia, and South Korea) showed breakdown resilience in their U-turns; the other four were seen as showing the third form of democratic resilience in their return to democracy.

Five factors that appeared to be significant in the return to democracy of these eight countries were: "executive constraints, mass mobilization, alternation in power, unified opposition coalescing with civil society, and international democracy support".

Executive constraints were actions by legislative or judicial powers, such as a constitutional court. Pro-democracy mass mobilization occurred in response to corruption scandals in some cases (Moldova, South Korea), and to anti-democratic policy reforms in some others (Maldives, North Macedonia, Slovenia, Bolivia).

Alternation in power was the transition of power to pro-democratic parties via elections in five cases, including three cases where, although "democracy had already broken down", elections in conditions favouring the incumbents nevertheless removed them from power. In the other cases, alternation of power happened via impeachment or term limits. The unity of opposition political parties and civil society was seen as a significant factor in seven of the eight cases. The factor of international democracy support refers to legal and political support from the Inter-American Commission on Human Rights and institutions of the European Union.

In 2025, Croissant and Lott found that their Democratic Resilience Capacity parameter, which combines macro-institutional, political party, civil society and political efficacy factors believed to support democratic resilience, did not explain bounceback resilience in their analysis of 103 democracies since 2000.

=== U-turn statistics ===
In 2025, Marina Nord and colleagues defined a democratic U-turn as a "period of substantive two-directional regime transformation along a democracy–autocracy continuum, in which autocratization is closely followed by and linked to subsequent democratization", in which both movements are "substantial and sustained", the two movements happen over a short (few-year) time interval, and the autocratization and democratization must be "endogenously interlinked", i.e. interpreted as linked by qualitative historical evidence.

Nord et al used the V-Dem Democracy Indices from 1900 through to 2023, and added their analysis to the Episodes of Regime Transformation (ERT) dataset. They found 102 U-turns in 69 countries. Over the full period, 52% of autocratization cases became U-turns; 44% became U-turns during 1900 to 1993, and 73% became U-turns during 1994 to 2003. Most U-turns (90%) ended with restored or improved levels of democracy. The overall time scale from the onset of autocratization to restored democracy was found to be typically about eight years.

Nord et al classified the processes of the U-turns as either "authoritarian manipulation", "democratic reaction", or international intervention. Authoritarian manipulation refers to cases of either civilian or military authoritarian actors being responsible both for the autocratization and then taking actions, such as a coup and a promise to hold elections, which they hope will let them retain power, but in practice (in some cases) leads to democratization. Democratic reactions are cases in which either grassroots citizens' groups, elites, or grassroots–elite alliances obtain the U-turn by elections, street protests, or legislative or judicial bodies. International interventions include military invasion (such as the invasion of Italy and France by the Allied Powers during World War II), or mediation by regional leaders that led to the Accra Comprehensive Peace Agreement and the United Nations Mission in Liberia and the 2005 Liberian general election.

Matías Bianchi and colleagues disputed the long-term significance of the post-1993 U-turns, finding that 90% of the cases dropped to a lower democracy level within five years or less. They interpreted this to imply that bounce-back resilience indicated overall regime instability rather than resilience that tends to lead to a stable return to democracy. Bianchi et al cited constitutional changes in Germany and Norway in the mid-2020s as "common sense measures that could help to future-proof democracy".

== Resilience methods ==
=== Parliamentary procedure ===
In 2026, Madeleine Rogers argued that parliamentary procedure had been used in democratic backsliding in ways that were "buried in confusing complexities that are difficult for non-experts to disentangle, and well outside of the attention of the general public". Rogers proposed six methods of resilience against backsliding in parliamentary procedure. "Protect[ing] the rules" by codifying fundamental procedures should increase the political cost of manipulating those procedures. "Redesign[ing] fast-track procedures" would protect some fundamental procedures from fast-tracking, and fast-track procedures themselves could be redesigned to better allow corrections and checks, while still allowing for speed. "Target[ing] conflicts of interest" for agenda-setting, time allocation and disciplinary powers would reduce the ability to use these for politicians' or parties' self-interest. "Optimiz[ing] the role of the opposition" in ways that increase opposition rights could improve accountability but would have to avoid "paralysing governance". "Ensur[ing] opportunities for review" would entail more possibilities for the review of procedures violating democratic legitimacy. "Institutionaliz[ing] civic participation" would "broad[en] the protective ecosystem" by allowing citizens and civil society to oppose abuses of parliamentary procedures.

== See also ==
- Democratic backsliding
- Democratic consolidation
