= Bill 99 =

2000 Quebec law

Quebec Legislature
- Long title: Act respecting the exercise of the fundamental rights and prerogatives of the Québec people and the Québec State
- Enacted: February 28, 2001
- Administered by: Minister responsible for Canadian Relations and the Canadian Francophonie

Legislative history
- Bill title: Bill 99
- Status: In force

Bill 99 (R.S.Q., c. E-20.2) is a Quebec law concerning the consequences of any future referendum on independence; it was enacted in 2000 in response to the enactment of the federal Clarity Act by the Parliament of Canada. The full official title of the law is "An Act respecting the exercise of the fundamental rights and prerogatives of the Québec people and the Québec State" (French: Loi sur l'Exercice des droits fondamentaux et des prérogatives du peuple québécois et de l'État du Québec). It has no formal short title and so is commonly referred to as "Bill 99", the designation under which it was introduced in the Quebec legislature by the Parti Québécois.

== History ==
The bill was introduced by Joseph Facal to the National Assembly of Quebec in an emergency session on 15 December 1999, two days after the introduction of the Clarity Act in the House of Commons of Canada. It was adopted on 7 December 2000, by a vote of 69 to 41. The bill was opposed by Liberal leader Jean Charest, who preferred the National Assembly pass a motion rather than a law.

Whereas the federal act states that, in the case of a referendum about the secession of a Canadian province, the House of Commons has the power to determine afterwards whether the question was clear enough and whether the obtained majority was large enough for the result to be accepted, the provincial act stipulates that Quebecers may determine unilaterally how to exercise their right to choose their political regime, including sovereignty, and that the winning option in a referendum is whichever obtains 50% of the votes plus one. Both acts are mandates given to their respective governments.

While opposed to Bill 99, the opposition Liberal Party tabled a motion agreeing with many of its central provisions, including the right of Quebec to decide any referendum question and the 50%-plus-one rule.

The motivation for Bill 99 was to ensure that, even in the absence a referendum, Quebec's political fate would result only from decisions made by Quebecers and not by other Canadians. The constitutional validity of both the Clarity Act and Bill 99 has been questioned, however, with respect to the Constitution Act 1867's allocation of legislative powers between the federal and provincial government.

== Legal challenge ==
In August 2007, three justices of the Quebec Court of Appeal unanimously held that Keith Henderson, former leader of the Equality Party, an English-language rights group, had standing to challenge the legality of the statute, which the Quebec Superior Court dubbed "Bill 99" in the absence of a short title for it. In 2018, the Quebec Superior Court ruled that Bill 99 was constitutional, as its wording did not actually authorize a unilateral declaration of independence.
