= Shawn Rosenberg =

Canadian academic

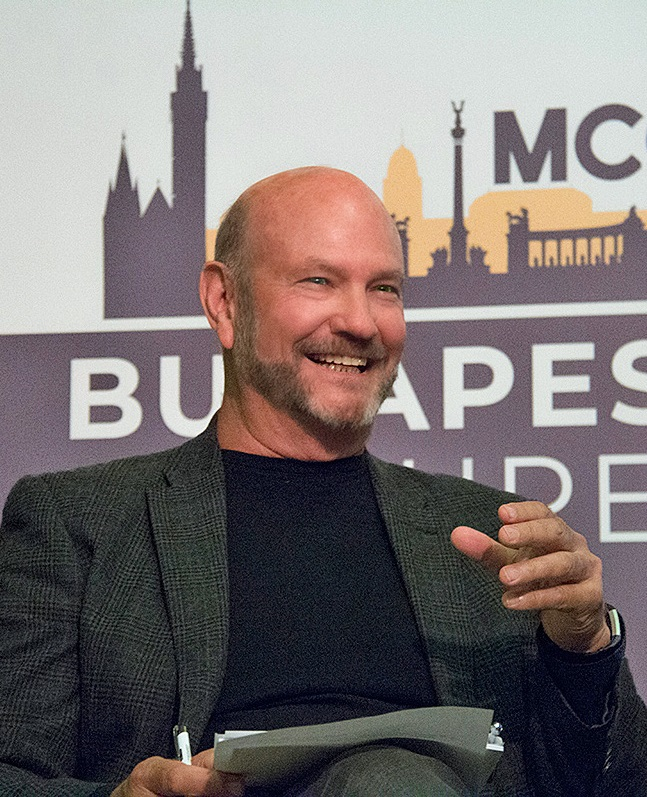
- Born: Winnipeg, Manitoba, Canada
- Occupations: Author, academic and researcher
- Spouse: Maria D. Bermudez
- Children: Angele Rosenberg; Phillip Rosenberg

Academic background
- Education: B.A., Political Science; M. Litt., Political Sociology
- Alma mater: Yale University; Harvard University; Nuffield College, Oxford

Academic work
- Institutions: University of California, Irvine
- Notable ideas: Development of political thinking Political candidate image-making Citizen incompetence and democratic decline

Shawn Rosenberg is a Canadian author, academic and a researcher. He is a Professor of Political Science & Psychological Science at University of California, Irvine. His research focuses on cognition and political ideology, candidate image-making, the decline of democracy and the rise of populism. In an article on Politico, he was called "one of the lions" of the field of political psychology.

He was the founding Director of the Graduate Program in Political Psychology at UC Irvine. He has been a member of the editorial board of various journals including Political Psychology, Interdisciplinary Journal of Populism. His research has been featured in the New York Times, Los Angeles Times, Politico.com and several other newspapers and magazines.

== Education ==
Rosenberg was born in Winnipeg and was raised in Canada, the US and Mexico. He received his Bachelors in Political Science from Yale University in 1972. He then did graduate study in Psychology at Harvard University and sociology at Nuffield College, Oxford. Rosenberg received his Masters of Letters Degree in Political Sociology and Psychology from Oxford University in 1982. He was then a Postdoctoral Fellow in Political Science and Psychology at Yale University.

== Career ==
Rosenberg was first employed as a Lecturer of Political Science at Yale University. In 1981, he accepted a position of Assistant Professor at University of California, Irvine where he was promoted to Associate Professor in 1988 and to Professor of Political Science & Psychological Science in 2000. During his tenure at University of California, he served as founding Director of Political Psychology Graduate Program from 1991 till 2014. He has a been a Fellow of the Princeton University Center for Human Values and a Visiting Professor at the University of California, Berkeley, the University of Amsterdam, the University of Utrecht and Lund University. He has also served as a consultant to the California Commission on Teacher Education, as an assistant to Alastair Gillespie, Minister of State for Science and Technology, Canada and as a speechwriter for the James C. Corman, US House of Representatives.

=== Research ===
In his research, Rosenberg has theorized about the nature of political psychology and has conducted significant empirical research on ideology, and political cognition, candidate image making citizen development and democracy. Much of Rosenberg's early work focuses on defining political psychology and its relationship to the other social sciences. In this vein, he has critically examined the psychological presuppositions of neoclassical economics and its applicability to the study of political behavior. He argues that there is necessarily an important disconnect between government policy initiatives and the choices citizens make to realize their preferences.

Addressing political sociology, Rosenberg similarly suggests that citizen attitudes and behaviors cannot adequately be explained by their social situation or cultural context. Rather than being simple learners, citizens actively reconstruct the information to which they are exposed. Throughout Rosenberg argues there is a need to recognize the quasi-independent structure of how people think. At several points in his writing, he has developed his ‘structural pragmatic’ view of political psychology to integrate the individualism of psychology and the collectivism of sociology. In so doing, he also addresses the necessarily intertwined relationship between empirical research and normative inquiry.

Rosenberg's empirical research has focused on the study of political ideology and cognition. In several books, he has proposed that there is a single structuring logic underlies the various political views an individual holds. He further argues that over time this underlying logic may develop and the broad quality of how a person thinks about politics will thus change. Where individuals have developed to different degrees, this can lead to stark differences in the understanding of political events they construct. Rosenberg has conducted both in-depth interviews and experiments to substantiate his claims. The evidence suggests that adults construct fundamentally different understandings of the basic nature of nationality, citizenship, governance and international relations.

Rosenberg shifted his attention to the study of democracy in the early 2000s. To begin he focused on deliberative democracy. He argued that research needs to attend less to the impact of deliberation on participants' attitudes and more on the quality of the deliberation itself. To facilitate this he developed a typology of forms of deliberative engagement ranging from a very simplistic, restrictive proto-discourse through a largely uncritical conventional discourse to a more reflective, creative collaborative discourse. In his empirical research, Rosenberg demonstrated that in the self-directed citizen deliberations, there is a worrying lack of the more reflective, critical kind of discourse typically assumed by democratic theorists.

With the rise of populism, Rosenberg has deployed his political psychological approach to assess the attractiveness of illiberal populisms and the concomitant weakness of democracy in the US and Europe. In Democracy Devouring Itself, he argues that liberal democracy is overly complicated and abstract, and thus alienating for most citizens. In contrast, populism, with its clear categories of ‘us’ and ‘them’ and its simple authoritarian view of power, offers a vision that is more readily understood and thus more comfortably embraced. Consequently, when free to make the choice, people reject liberal democratic concepts and institutions in favor of the populist alternative.

== Awards and honors ==
- 1989 – Erik H. Erikson Award for Early Career Achievement, International Society for Political Psychology
- 1990 – Outstanding Book Award, Association of University and College Libraries

== Selected publications ==
- Political Reasoning and Cognition: A Piagetian View (Duke University Press, 1988)
- Reason, Ideology and Politics (Princeton University Press,1988)
- The Not So Common Sense: How People Judge Social and Political Life (Yale University Press, 2002)
- Deliberation, Participation and Democracy: Can the People Govern? (Palgrave Macmillan, 2007)
