= R. Daniel Kelemen =

Roger Daniel Kelemen is a scholar of law and political science. He is McCourt Chair at the McCourt School of Public Policy at Georgetown University, having previously been on the faculties of Rutgers University and the University of Oxford. He is also a Senior Associate (Non-Resident) in the Europe, Russia, and Eurasia Program of the Center for Strategic and International Studies. His 2011 book Eurolegalism: The Transformation of Law and Regulation in the European Union was named best book by the European Union Studies Association.

== Works ==
- Kelemen, R. Daniel (2004). The Rules of Federalism. Harvard University Press. ISBN 978-0-674-01309-4.
- Capoccia, Giovanni; Kelemen, R. Daniel (2007). "The Study of Critical Junctures: Theory, Narrative, and Counterfactuals in Historical Institutionalism". World Politics. 59 (3): 341–369. doi:10.1017/S0043887100020852. S2CID 44033044.
- Kelemen, R. Daniel; Vogel, David (2010). "Trading Places: The Role of the United States and the European Union in International Environmental Politics". Comparative Political Studies. 43 (4): 427–456. doi:10.1177/0010414009355265. S2CID 154676471.
- Kelemen, R. Daniel (2011). Eurolegalism: The Transformation of Law and Regulation in the European Union. Harvard University Press. ISBN 978-0-674-04694-8.
- Jones, Erik; Kelemen, R. Daniel; Meunier, Sophie (2016). "Failing Forward? The Euro Crisis and the Incomplete Nature of European Integration". Comparative Political Studies. 49 (7): 1010–1034. doi:10.1177/0010414015617966. S2CID 155286038.
