= Defective democracy =

Type of political system

Defective democracy (or flawed democracy) is a concept that was proposed by the political scientists Wolfgang Merkel, Hans-Jürgen Puhle, and Aurel S. Croissant at the beginning of the 21st century to subtilize the distinctions between totalitarian, authoritarian, and democratic political systems. It is based on the concept of embedded democracy. While there are four forms of defective democracy, how each nation reaches the point of defectiveness varies. One recurring theme is the geographical location of the nation, which includes the effects of the influence of surrounding nations in the region. Other causes for democracies being "defective" include their path of modernization, level of modernization, economic trends, social capital, civil society, political institutions, and education.

== Aspects of healthy democracies ==
A representative democracy is a system of government in which private citizens exercise their power directly by electing representatives to one or more governing bodies, such as a legislature. Healthy democracies can be classified as defective when any of the key components of government are missing or fail to properly link to one another. All democracies provide universal suffrage, free and fair elections occurring on a recurring basis, a multi-party system, multiple sources of information in the country, universal rights, and voters' decision-making unhindered by country elites or external actors.

== Types of defective democracies ==
=== Exclusive democracy ===
Exclusive democracies is where certain groups have more rights than others. In the United States, historical examples like slavery in the United States, the nadir of race relations, Native American genocide in the United States, the Gilded Age, and the exclusion of women from voting and employment underscore systemic flaws. Movements such as women's suffrage, the labor movement, second-wave feminism, and the civil rights movement led to legislative changes like the Nineteenth Amendment to the United States Constitution, Fair Labor Standards Act, Equal Pay Act of 1963, and the Civil Rights Act, aiming to rectify these exclusions. Despite progress, enduring legacies like redlining, environmental racism, race disparities in incarceration, gerrymandering, decline in unions, overturning Roe v. Wade, and the gender pay gap persist. There is also criticism of the U.S. as a corporatocracy that stems from extensive corporate lobbying and laws granting corporations rights. Residents of the territories of the United States are only able to elect a non-voting member to the House of Representatives and cannot vote in the U.S presidential election.

=== Domain democracy ===
When militaries, entrepreneurs, landlords, local militias, or multi-national corporations take up political domains and veto power from the hands of democratically elected officials, the result is a domain democracy. An example of a military coup resulting in a domain democracy is the 2017 Zimbabwean coup d'état, in which the Zimbabwean military seized control of the Zimbabwe Broadcasting Corporation, key areas of Harare city, and placed Zimbabwean President Robert Mugabe under house arrest. In this instance, the coup was successful and after the resignation of Mugabe, Emmerson Mnangagwa peacefully became the 3rd President of Zimbabwe. South Korea's Chaebol have a considerable amount of political domain and power towards politics, which has led towards the high rates of corruption in South Korea. The state regained some of the autonomy it had lost during the 'Chaebol Republic' from 1987 to 1997 and was able to implement reforms in a temporary corporatist framework. However, the chaebol adapted to the new situation and used the market-friendly reforms in their favour.

=== Illiberal democracy ===
When elected officials are no longer held to constitutional principles due to the deterioration of power held by the judiciary, the nation becomes an illiberal democracy in which the rule of law is damaged or flawed, and the constitutional norms have little or no binding impact on elected officials and their actions. Individual civil rights are either partially nullified or not established. Illiberal democracy is the most common form of defective democracy.

In 2017, Venezuela held a controversial election for state governors. Venezuela's President Nicolás Maduro and his United Socialist Party swept the election, winning 17 of 23 states and 54% of the popular vote, despite Maduro's approval rating fluctuating between 17% and 22%. Ruling party members used state resources to help their campaigns, giving them an advantage over their rivals. The use of state funds for campaigns is illegal under normal circumstances but the Venezuelan court system had deteriorated to the point at which it only acted to serve the ruling party instead of serving true justice. This and other factors make Venezuela a defective democracy.

=== Delegative democracy ===
In delegative democracies, the executive branch reigns supreme and the legislature and judiciary have very limited power over the executive. Constitutional norms are rarely followed and the checks and balances of power required in healthy democracies are undermined.

Delegative democracies commonly happen when there is one ruling party in a nation. Mexico prior to 1997 is an example. Mexico's ruling party, the Institutional Revolutionary Party, ruled unchecked by any viable competition since the Mexican Revolution. During the PRI's political dominance in Mexico, the nation was a delegative democracy with the executive branch ruling supreme and the Congress effectively rubber-stamping decisions.

=== Anocratic regimes ===
Anocractic regimes are dictatorships with a democratic institution of the legislature. They possess a mixture of both democratic and autocratic attributes, which can lead to an increase in conflict within the nation. These types of governments can exist when the ruling elite avoid severe rights abuses and do not steal or cancel elections. The ruling party ensures the rights abuses are not well-publicized, which would agitate the people they are ruling over.

Cuba for example, is an anocratic regime with both autocratic and democratic attributes. In Cuba, the Communist Party has complete control over the nation but there are still democratic attributes, namely the National Assembly of Popular Power, whose 600 members are elected for five-year terms by popular vote. None of the elections for Assembly positions, however, are contested.

== See also ==
- Democracy: The God That Failed—2001 book by Hans-Hermann Hoppe
- Full democracy
- Herrenvolk democracy
- Semi-democracy
- Totalitarian democracy

== Literature ==
- Bendel, Petra; Croissant, Aurel; Rüb, Friedbert W., eds. (2002), Zwischen Demokratie und Diktatur: Zur Konzeption und Empirie demokratischer Grauzonen, Opladen: Leske + Budrich, ISBN 3-8100-3087-2
- Krennerich, Michael (2005), "Defekte Demokratie", in Nohlen, Dieter; Schultze, Rainer-Olaf (eds.), Lexikon der Politikwissenschaft: Theorien, Methoden, Begriffe, vol. 1 (3rd ed.), München: Beck, pp. 119–121, ISBN 3-406-54116-X
- Merkel, Wolfgang (2010), Systemtransformation (2nd ed.), Wiesbaden: VS Verlag für Sozialwissenschaften, ISBN 978-3-531-14559-4
- Merkel, Wolfgang; Puhle, Hans-Jürgen; Croissant, Aurel, eds. (2003), Defekte Demokratien, vol. 1, Opladen: Leske + Budrich, ISBN 3-8100-3234-4
- Merkel, Wolfgang; Puhle, Hans-Jürgen; Croissant, Aurel, eds. (2006), Defekte Demokratien, vol. 2, Wiesbaden: VS Verlag für Sozialwissenschaften, ISBN 3-8100-3235-2
- O'Donnell, Guillermo (2004), "Delegative Democracy", Journal of Democracy, 5 (1): 55–69, doi:10.1353/jod.1994.0010, S2CID 8558740
- Zakaria, Fareed (1997), "The Rise of Illiberal Democracy", Foreign Affairs, 76 (6): 22–43, doi:10.2307/20048274, JSTOR 20048274
