= Embedded democracy =

Form of government

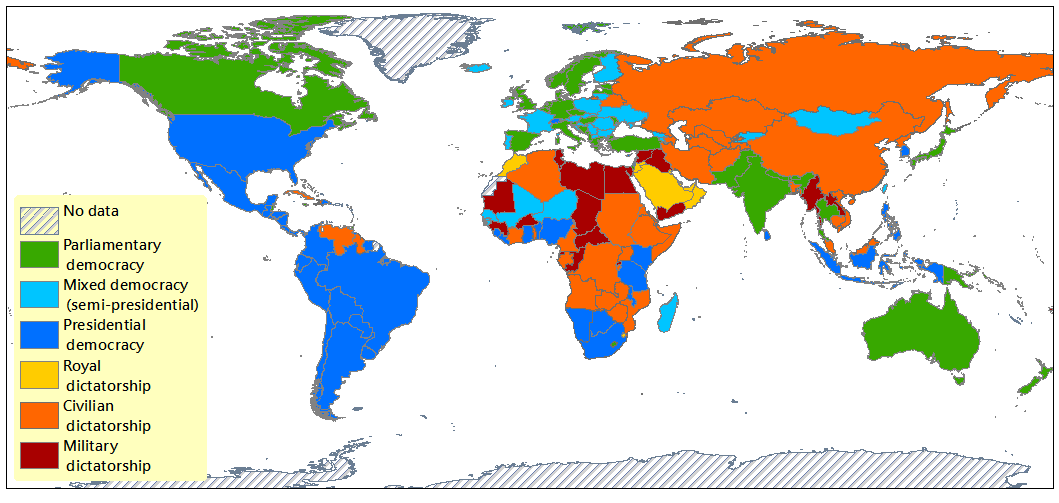
2008 map of world democracies

Embedded democracy is a form of government in which democratic governance is secured by democratic partial regimes. The term "embedded democracy" was coined by political scientists Wolfgang Merkel, Hans-Jürgen Puhle, and Aurel Croissant, who identified "five interdependent partial regimes" necessary for an embedded democracy: electoral regime, political participation, civil rights, horizontal accountability, and the power of the elected representatives to govern. The five internal regimes work together to check the power of the government, while external regimes also help to secure and stabilize embedded democracies. Together, all the regimes ensure that an embedded democracy is guided by the three fundamental principles of freedom, equality, and control.

== Embedded democracy ==
The ideal embedded democracy is guided by the three fundamental democratic principles of freedom, equality, and control. Merkel uses Robert Dahl's definition of political equality, which includes equality "before the law and in the political process." While equality can infringe upon freedom, an embedded democracy should establish a balance between equality and freedom; to preserve the equality-freedom equilibrium, there must be checks on government power (horizontal and vertical accountability).

=== Internal regimes of embedded democracy ===
==== Democratic electoral regime ====
Merkel writes about five different forms of internal embeddedness, with democratic electoral regime occupying the central position because "it is the most obvious expression of the sovereignty of the people, the participation of citizens, and the equal weight allotted to their individual preferences." Democratic electoral regime is the backbone of an embedded democracy because it differentiates between authoritarian regimes and democratic regimes. For a democratic regime, equal political rights are a requirement, and "the citizens of the state should be included" in the political process.

Four factors support the democratic electoral regime: "universal, active suffrage, universal, passive right to vote, free and fair elections and elected representatives." In order to maintain a democratic electoral regime, all four factors must be present. Voters must all be able to vote in free and fair elections, without coercion, to elect representatives for themselves in the government. An electoral democracy is a form of government in which the democratic electoral regime is present, but other attributes of liberal embedded democracies are lacking. Merkel writes that the "electoral democracy merely entails that the election of the ruling elite be based on the formal, universal right to vote, such that elections are general, free and regular."

Freedom House uses its own set of criteria for determining whether or not a state is democratic, which include the existence of free and fair elections Furthermore, "the most popular definition of democracy equates it with regular elections." The principle of democratic electoral regimes is an important one for embedded democracy because electoral regimes are the base of democracies; electoral regimes act as the foundation for the other internal regimes due to the importance of elections for democratic processes.

==== Political participation ====
The internal regime of political participation is closely related to the electoral regime. According to Merkel, participatory rights "make the public arena an independent political sphere of action, where organizational and communicative power is developed." Political participation is facilitated by freedom of expression, freedom of assembly, the right to petition, and freedom of the press. In Merkel's vision of embedded democracy, citizens are able to form independent interest groups and organize parties to help them express their political preferences. Political participation is not limited to traditional institutionalized channels for expression; it can take place in arenas like the private media and civil society. Some scholars of democracy disagree with Merkel's assertion that frequent political participation is the ideal for a representative democracy. Joseph Schumpeter sees direct participation as limited to elections in a representative democracy; in the intervals between elections, citizens allow representatives to speak for them. Robert Dahl argues that only a small portion of the population will be active in political participation and warns that mass participation in a representative democracy could lead to dictatorship.

In weak or failed states, "low-intensity citizenship" is often commonplace. This means that many people are denied their full political rights or choose not to exercise them. Political participation in modern democracies is frequently weakened by public apathy and disinterest in government. As government bureaucracies have grown in size, people have generally participated in political processes less frequently, especially those in low socioeconomic groups. Some countries have more equitable voting patterns than others; for instance, Denmark has less income inequality than the United States as well as higher rates of political participation. However, political participation does not depend solely on income distribution: it is also influenced by individual motivation and group affiliation. In some cases, individuals whose economic status predisposes them to political apathy are more likely to participate if motivated by identification with a large group.

Proponents of deliberative democracy believe that the ideal democracy allows individuals to participate equally in discussions. In Fishkin's vision of deliberative democracy, interest groups or parties do not dominate a discussion. Fishkin acknowledges difficulties in achieving mass participation: people view their opinions as statistically insignificant, and they are often uneducated about political topics and easily influenced by the media. In modern democracies, most citizens avoid discussing politics with people they disagree with, which limits the potential for conciliation and compromise. While the internet can provide a forum for deliberation and potentially change participation patterns, it may also increase political polarization. Deliberative polling may offer one means for political participation.

==== Civil rights ====
The first two partial regimes of embedded democracy, the democratic electoral regime and political rights of participation, must be supplemented by civil rights Civil rights are central to the rule of law in an embedded democracy. Merkel defines the rule of law as “the principle that the state is bound to uphold its laws effectively and to act according to clearly defined prerogatives.” The rule of law contains and limits state power.

The core of liberal rule of law lies in constitutional rights. These rights protect individuals against executive and legislative actions that infringe on an individual's freedom. Independent courts are also an important aspect of the rule of law. Courts need the authority to review the behaviors of the executive and legislative branches. Merkel calls the courts “constitutional custodians of the legislature and supervisors of executive conformity to law.”

Civil rights are negative rights of freedom against the state. These rights need to be protected from any majority of citizens or parliament to prevent a tyranny of the majority. To avoid this, the executive and legislative branches need barriers in place that prevent individuals, groups, or the political opposition from being oppressed by majority decisions. Civil rights are a basic condition for the existence of citizenship. Individual rights to protection include the rights of life, liberty, and property- which are Locke's description of natural rights.

In an embedded democracy, rights are also established to protect against illegitimate arrest, exile, terror, torture or unjustifiable intervention into personal life. Other basic civil rights include equal access to the law and equal treatment by the law. According to Merkel, “these civil rights tame majoritarian democratic cycles and thereby support-seemingly paradoxically-the democratization of democracy”. Securing civil rights creates a barrier against the state infringing on individual freedoms. However, the guarantee of civil rights alone cannot sufficiently make up or support a constitutional democracy, because there has to be support from the other partial regimes.

==== Horizontal accountability ====
Horizontal accountability requires a system of checks and balances between the three branches of government: executive, legislative, and judicial. In an embedded democracy, the branches of government should be able to function with a reasonable amount of autonomy despite the fact that they are not wholly separate but instead "check each other reciprocally, without one body dominating or interfering with the constitutionally defined core-sphere of the others."

Within Merkel's model of embedded democracy, the regime of horizontal accountability works to constitutionally ensure that an appropriate amount of power is shared among the different institutions, which helps secure the civil rights of the people of the state. There should be agencies with the legal power to expose and punish governmental institutions for corruption or other unlawful actions. This ensures that no one branch gains a preponderance of power and is able to unduly influence the policies and governance of the state. This horizontal accountability works in tandem with vertical accountability, which is the systems by which citizens check the power of the government elections, the media, or civil society. However, horizontal accountability carries more weight in ensuring the internal embeddedness of democracy, as it is more frequently used than vertical accountability and has a more substantial support from the constitution of a state. If it is indeed constitutionally mandated, horizontal accountability can "close a central gap of control in the basic democratic structure, one that is not covered by the first three partial regimes"

==== Power of elected representative to govern ====
The power of elected representatives to govern, or what Merkel refers to as the “effective power to govern,” is the final partial regime. Effective power to govern is necessary in an embedded democracy that is representative of “not only the procedural aspect but also the goals of democratic elections.” Within the different dimensions of embedded democracy, as defined by Merkel, effective power to govern falls under the “dimension of effective agenda control.”

Effective power to govern is a necessity for functioning democracies, but Merkel emphasizes that this is not the case for countries that have only recently democratized. In particular, nations that hold democratic elections but still host military forces with some degree of autonomous power cannot fully meet the requirements of effective power to govern, since unelected military officials may have undue sway over governmental operations. In these kinds of democracies, the underpinnings of political participation are compromised as the general populace is only allowed “low intensity citizenship,” with most decisions left to extra-governmental, non-democratic forces. However, some arms of the government, such as a central bank or constitutional court, may be left autonomous or nearly autonomous and still meet the requirements of effective power to govern. This is only possible if these autonomous bodies are established with “constitutional consent,” fulfilling the social contract between the state and the people

In keeping with Merkel's assertion that “mutual embeddedness means that some partial regimes support the functioning of another partial regime,” effective power to govern is closely tied to the electoral regime. By ensuring that democratic elections are meaningful and democratically elected officials are afforded the representative powers expected by voters, maintenance of the effective power to govern provides "the necessary complementary support" to the electoral regime in "mak[ing] up liberal ‘embedded democracies.'"

Merkel's notion of effective power to govern has been traced to Robert Dahl's minimalist conception of democracy. Dahl's definition of democracy requires that governmental “institutions...depend on elections and other expressions of the citizens’ preferences,” just as Merkel insists that the power to make policy must ultimately rest with democratically elected representatives of the people.

=== External factors of embeddedness ===
==== Socio-economic ====
If a nation is more socio-economically developed, there is a greater chance that it will sustain a democracy. The evidence supports the link between the economy and democratic sustainability. Arguments against this idea are that economic prosperity is not the only necessary requirement for a successful democracy, nor can economic development be used to predict the permanence of democratization. Merkel gives the example that the United States cannot claim to have a higher quality democracy than Finland's democracy, even though the United States has a higher GDP per capita.

There is also a connection between inequality and democratic government. When unequal distributions of economic resources lead to wider wealth and income gaps, which in turn lead to more poverty, there is a negative impact on democracy. Hermann Heller stresses that a sufficiently homogeneous economic basis among citizens provides for equal participation in the democratic process. Once citizens have reached an adequate social and economic standing, they can form their own independent opinions and participate equally in the democratic process. Scholars agree that real political equality cannot be produced if there is severe socio-economic inequality.

==== Civil society ====
Merkel states that civil society serves four functions in strengthening a democracy: protection of the individual from the arbitrary use of state power, support for the rule of law and the balance of powers, education of citizens and recruitment of political elites, and institutionalization of the public sphere as a medium of democratic self-reflection.

In the case of protection from state power, the philosopher John Locke's idea of civil society as separate from the political sphere is referenced. Civil society facilitates the development of individual autonomy alongside natural rights and property rights to further the embeddedness of democracy. Merkel also references Montesquieu's concept of institutionalized civil society to check the power of the government and to promote balance within a state. Alexis de Tocqueville's concept of civil society and social capital explains how a civil society can work to normalize and solidify the democratic process and establish an embedded democracy. Local associations are meant to create trust and foster a sense of civic responsibility that is carried out into the national level as well as the political sphere. According to Habermas, civil society can also provide a platform for the economically and socially disadvantaged to air grievances with the government and improve their state.

==== International integration ====
Integration into international organizations provides a source of external stability that democratic regimes cannot produce by themselves. In particular, social, economic, and political organizations (as opposed to military organizations) are necessary, since authoritarian regimes and defective democracies are able to function and potentially thrive within the confines of even democratically-dominated military alliances. Merkel points to the European Union as the "most successful [organization] in the international embedding of democracies." International integration ultimately serves to protect the integrity of a democracy's internal partial regimes by subjecting them to external scrutiny. At the same time, better-established internal regimes also allow the state to be more effective in repelling threats from external actors. Therefore, international integration works in multiple ways to further embed and normalize democracy through the internal regimes.

== Defective democracy ==
Unlike embedded democracies, defective democracies are missing one or more of the internal factors of embeddedness. These factors vary on a case-by-case basis, which results in some confusion regarding the classification of non-embedded regimes. Merkel named four notable types of defective democracy: exclusive democracy, illiberal democracy, delegative democracy, and domain democracy.

=== Illiberal democracy ===
Illiberal democracy is one of the four subtypes of defective democracy. Differentiating illiberal democracies from other types of democracy is difficult. One method used to differentiate is by using numerical thresholds provided by the ‘‘civil rights scale,’’ which is one of two measurement scales used by Freedom House. Every regime with a score of 3.5-5.5 on a scale of 1-7, with 7 being a completely totalitarian regime, is considered an illiberal democracy. However, Freedom House offers no justification for these thresholds, and the scales used are often outdated.

Illiberal democracies are in a weak, incomplete, and damaged constitutional state. The executive and legislative control of the state is only weakly limited by the judiciary. Additionally, constitutional norms in an illiberal democracy have little impact on government actions, and individual civil rights are either partially repressed or not yet established. The legitimacy of the rule of law is damaged. Illiberal democracy is the most common type of defective democracy, constituting 22 of 29 defective democracies as defined by Merkel. Examples of illiberal democracies include many Latin American countries, as well as some countries in Eastern Europe and Asia. The following are illiberal democracies: Brazil, Bolivia, Guatemala, El Salvador, Honduras, Mexico, Nicaragua, Panama, Paraguay, Peru, Albania, Bulgaria, Croatia, Macedonia, Moldova, Romania, Russia, Ukraine, Thailand, Philippines, Bangladesh, and Nepal.

=== Domain democracy ===
A domain democracy is a form of defective democracy in which actors who were not democratically elected as representatives of the people hold veto power in policy matters. Actors of this type "take certain political domains out of the hands of democratically elected representatives," hence the term domain democracy. Domain democracies are considered to be highly regional phenomena, with many found in Latin America and Southeast Asia, but few in Central Asia or Eastern Europe. Paraguay, Thailand, and Colombia are commonly set forth as examples of domain democracies, specifically during their times of economic rule by guerrilla forces

=== Exclusive democracy ===
Exclusive democracies are one form of defective democracies in which "one or more segments of the adult population are excluded from the civil right of universal suffrage." This form of defective democracy is defective because the internal regime of civil rights as well as the internal regime of elections (including free and fair) are not allowed within the government system. As part of their civil rights, citizens need to be guaranteed sovereignty and the ability to vote and the exclusion of some citizens from electoral processes creates an exclusive democracy. Apartheid South Africa is an example of an exclusive democracy because not all members of the adult population were guaranteed the right of universal suffrage.

=== Delegative democracy ===
A delegative democracy occurs when there is a lack of horizontal accountability and one branch of government becomes powerful enough to control the entire government. In a delegative democracy, the judiciary and legislative branches are often unable to properly check the power of the executive branch. This lets the executive shift the balance of power into its favor.

However, the power of the executive in a delegative democracy is still restricted in the sense that the president has heavy control of the state only for the length of his term. This creates a high-stakes election process wherein the winner is granted power that is only checked by non-institutionalized power structures, such as those systems that create vertical accountability. Most of the research on delegative democracies has concerned the populist leaders of Central and South America who used the executive branch to govern the country as they saw fit.

=== Frozen Democracy ===
A frozen democracy occurs when a democratically elected leader or Government suspends elections either indefinitely or temporarily. Typically, this is done through the declaration of Martial Law. A frozen democracy differs from the other types in that it is still run by a democratically elected leader, but the elected representatives and/or the public are unable to vote to re-elect the current ruling party, or replace it with a new one. One modern example of a frozen democracy is Ukraine, whereby following Russia's illegal invasion, martial law was declared, thereby suspending the elections. Other examples include Latin American nations such as Venezuela in the 1990s.

== Alternative models for assessing democracies ==
Defective democracy is an alternative to terms such as electoral democracy, illiberal democracy, or partial democracy, all of which describe governing systems that meet only some of the conditions required for a full democracy. Merkel argues that using embedded democracy as the basis for assessing real regimes is a more nuanced method than the quantitative rankings released by organizations like Freedom House which are often used to categorize a democracy as liberal, semi-liberal, or illiberal.

Embedded and defective democracies are primarily categorized based on their institutions rather than their purposes or outcomes. This is in keeping with the procedural approach to democratic scholarship followed by scholars such as Schmitter and Huntington.

An embedded democracy can be considered a type of consolidated democracy, meaning that the democratic regime in an embedded democracy is seen as legitimate and stable. Political scientists debate the definition of democratic consolidation, but at minimum, a consolidated democracy is entrenched so that democracy is considered "the only game in town." Some scholars, like Merkel, take a maximalist approach to defining consolidated democracy by specifying the partial regimes of consolidation. Gunther considers three dimensions of consolidation—institutional, attitudinal, and behavioral—while Linz and Stepan highlight five arenas for consolidation: civil society, political society, rule of law, the state apparatus and economic society.

Other scholars have developed multidimensional models of democracy that are similar to Merkel's embedded democracy model. For instance, Dahl defines polyarchy based on seven distinct criteria: elected officials, free elections, inclusive suffrage, the right to run for office, freedom of expression, alternative information, and associational autonomy.

Some scholars critique Merkel's model for merely describing the institutional elements found in a liberal embedded democracy and then categorizing other "hybrid regimes" as diminished subtypes of democracy. Jayasuriya and Rodan point out that Merkel's model fails to account for how and why regimes form. Møller and Skanning praise Merkel's work for creating a cohesive system of democratic subtypes but argue that Merkel suffers from the "radial delusion," meaning that it lacks a hierarchical structure, which makes it difficult to conduct consistent empirical analyses of democratic regimes. According to Møller and Skanning, there are also inconsistencies between Merkel's original papers on embedded and defective democracy and later works by his colleagues Aurel Croissant and Hans-Jürgen Puhle.
