= Rodan (surname) =

Rodan is a surname of several origins. One origin is as a variant of Roden, which may be of English, Irish, German or Swedish origin. As an English surname, it is a toponymic from Roden, Shropshire, which takes its name from the River Roden, meaning 'swift or rushing river'. As an Irish surname, it is a cognate of Redding, an Anglicization of Gaelic Ó Rodáin. As a German surname, it is a variant of Rode, which is a shortened form of several ancient personal names beginning with the element hrōd, meaning 'renown', and as a Swedish surname is ornamental or an unexplained toponymic.

It may also be a surname of Catalan origin, from Rodés, a toponymic surname, or of Galician and Portuguese origin as a toponymic or metonymic occupational surname, from roda, meaning 'wheel'.

It may also be a surname of Hebrew origin.

Notable people with the surname include:

- David Rodan (born 1983), Australian rules football player
- Garry Rodan, Australian academic
- Gideon Rodan (1934–2006), Romanian-born American biochemist
- Joseph Rodan (born 1951), Fijian sprinter
- Katie Rodan (born 1955/56), American dermatologist, entrepreneur and author
- Mendi Rodan (1929–2009), Israeli conductor and educator
- Robert Rodan (1939–2021), American actor
- Steve Rodan (born 1954), Manx politician

== See also ==
- Rodan (disambiguation), other uses of the word
