= Rodan (disambiguation) =

Rodan is a giant flying monster, or kaiju from the Godzilla franchise

Rodan may also refer to:

- Rodan (film), the debut film of the flying monster by Ishiro Honda
- Rodan (band), an early-1990s rock band
- Rodan, a Time Lady who appears in the Doctor Who serial The Invasion of Time
- Rodan, an early 4th century Roman gladiator, depicted in the Gladiator Mosaic.
- Rodan, a military version of Odra series computers.
- Rodan (surname), a surname of multiple origins
- Rodan, a hip-hop MC part of the group Monsta Island Czars

== See also ==
- Auguste Rodin (1840–1917), French artist, most famous as a sculptor
- Radon, a chemical element
- Perry Rhodan, the world's most prolific science fiction (SF) series, published since 1961 in Germany
