= Schultz v. Wheaton Glass Co. =

Shultz v. Wheaton Glass Co.
- Court: United States Court of Appeals for the Third Circuit
- Full case name: George P. Shultz, Secretary of Labor, United States Department of Labor, v. Wheaton Glass Company
- Decided: January 13, 1970
- Citation: 421 F.2d 259 (3rd Cir. 1970)

Court membership
- Judges sitting: Abraham Lincoln Freedman, Collins Jacques Seitz, & Ruggero J. Aldisert

Case opinions
- Freedman

Shultz v. Wheaton Glass Co., 421 F.2d 259 (3rd Cir. 1970) was a case heard before the United States Court of Appeals for the Third Circuit in 1970. It is an important case in studying the impact of the Bennett Amendment on Title VII of the Civil Rights Act of 1964, helping to define the limitations of equal pay for men and women. In its rulings, the court determined that a job that is "substantially equal" in terms of what the job entails, although not necessarily in title or job description, is protected by the Equal Pay Act. An employer who hires a woman to do the same job as a man but gives the job a new title in order to offer it a lesser pay is discriminating under that act.

== Background ==
Wheaton Glass employed men as "selector-packer-stackers" but employed women as ""selector-packers". Both performed similar work in the company's warehouse in Millville, New Jersey but the longer title paid substantially higher wages.

== See also ==
- Gender equality
- List of gender equality lawsuits
