= County of Washington v. Gunther =

- Supreme Court of the United States

Argued March 23, 1981 Decided June 8, 1981
- Full case name: County of Washington, Oregon, et al. v. Alberta Gunther et al.
- Citations: 452 U.S. 161 (more) 101 S. Ct. 2242; 68 L. Ed. 2d 751

Case history
- Prior: Gunther v. Cnty. of Wash., 602 F.2d 882 (9th Cir. 1979); rehearing denied, 623 F.2d 1303 (9th Cir. 1980); cert. granted, 449 U.S. 950 (1980).

Court membership
- Chief Justice Warren E. Burger Associate Justices William J. Brennan Jr. · Potter Stewart; Byron White · Thurgood Marshall; Harry Blackmun · Lewis F. Powell Jr. William Rehnquist · John P. Stevens

Case opinions
- Majority: Brennan, joined by White, Marshall, Blackmun, Stevens
- Dissent: Rehnquist, joined by Burger, Stewart, Powell

Laws applied
- Title VII of the Civil Rights Act of 1964

County of Washington v. Gunther, 452 U.S. 161 (1981), is a United States labor law case concerning discrimination and the lower standards of protection for gender pay because of the Bennett Amendment in Title VII of the Civil Rights Act of 1964, §703(h).

== Background ==
In 1974, four female county prison guards sued the County of Washington in Oregon for being paid less than male guards and argued that to be unlawful sexual discrimination. The county argued that male guards spent more time overseeing prisoners and clerical tasks. It also argued that under the Bennett Amendment, the women could not claim unlawful pay discrimination unless they showed under the Fair Labor Standards Act that they were doing "equal work."

== Judgment ==
=== District Court ===
The district court found that male guards were responsible for overseeing more prisoners and also that female guards spent some of their time in clerical tasks. However, it also found as a matter of law that a sex-based wage discrimination claim cannot be brought under Title VII unless it satisfies the equal work standard of the Equal Pay Act of 1963.

=== Ninth Circuit Court of Appeals ===
While not reviewing the first finding, the Ninth Circuit Court of Appeals held with respect to the latter that "claims for sex-based wage discrimination can also be brought under Title VII even though no member of the opposite sex holds an equal but higher paying job, provided that the challenged wage rate is not exempted under the Equal Pay Act's affirmative defenses as to wage differentials attributable to seniority, merit, quantity or quality of production, or any other factor other than sex." It interpreted the intention of the amendment as incorporating "into Title VII only the affirmative defenses of the Equal Pay Act, not its prohibitory language requiring equal pay for equal work."

=== Supreme Court ===
The U.S. Supreme Court held that the women were not precluded from bringing a discrimination claim in principle, and they did not need to show they were doing strictly equal work. That left open the possibility to claim that work was of comparable value. Justice Brennan, speaking for the Court, indicated in the majority opinion that the Bennett Amendment did not preclude comparison of differences in pay but only those attributable to those four specific factors:

respondents seek to prove, by direct evidence, that their wages were depressed because of intentional sex discrimination, consisting of setting the wage scale for female guards, but not for male guards, at a level lower than its own survey of outside markets and the worth of the jobs warranted. The narrow question in this case is whether such a claim is precluded by the last sentence of § 703(h) of Title VII, called the "Bennett Amendment."

...

Title VII makes it an unlawful employment practice for an employer "to discriminate against any individual with respect to his compensation, terms, conditions, or privileges of employment, because of such individual's . . . sex. . . ." 42 U.S.C. § 2000e-2(a). The Bennett Amendment to Title VII, however provides:

"It shall not be an unlawful employment practice under this subchapter for any employer to differentiate upon the basis of sex in determining the amount of the wages or compensation paid or to be paid to employees of such employer if such differentiation is authorized by the provisions of section 206(d) of title 29." 42 U.S.C. § 2000e-2(h).

To discover what practices are exempted from Title VII's prohibitions by the Bennett Amendment, we must turn to § 206(d) the Equal Pay Act—which provides in relevant part:

"No employer having employees subject to any provisions of this section shall discriminate, within any establishment in which such employees are employed, between employees on the basis of sex by paying wages to employees in such establishment at a rate less than the rate at which he pays wages to employees of the opposite sex in such establishment for equal work on jobs the performance of which requires equal skill, effort, and responsibility, and which are performed under similar working conditions, except where such payment is made pursuant to (i) a seniority system; (ii) a merit system; (iii) a system which measures earnings by quantity or quality of production; or (iv) a differential based on any other factor other than sex." 77 Stat. 56, 29 U.S.C. § 206(d)(1).

On its face, the Equal Pay Act contains three restrictions pertinent to this case. First, its coverage is limited to those employers subject to the Fair Labor Standards Act. S.Rep.No.176, 88th Cong., 1st Sess., 2 (1963). Thus, the Act does not apply, for example, to certain businesses engaged in retail sales, fishing, agriculture, and newspaper publishing. See 29 U.S.C. §§ 203(s), 213(a) (1976 ed. and Supp.III). Second, the Act is restricted to cases involving "equal work on jobs the performance of which requires equal skill, effort, and responsibility, and which are performed under similar working conditions." 29 U.S.C. § 206(d)(1). Third, the Act's four affirmative defenses exempt any wage differentials attributable to seniority, merit, quantity or quality of production, or "any other factor other than sex." Ibid.

Petitioners argue that the purpose of the Bennett Amendment was to restrict Title VII sex-based wage discrimination claims to those that could also be brought under the Equal Pay Act, and thus that claims not arising from "equal work" are precluded. Respondents, in contrast, argue that the Bennett Amendment was designed merely to incorporate the four affirmative defenses of the Equal Pay Act into Title VII for sex-based wage discrimination claims. Respondents thus contend that claims for sex-based wage discrimination can be brought under Title VII even though no member of the opposite sex holds an equal but higher paying job, provided that the challenged wage rate is not based on seniority, merit, quantity or quality of production, or "any other factor other than sex." The Court of Appeals found respondents' interpretation the "more persuasive." 623 F.2d, at 1311. While recognizing that the language and legislative history of the provision are not unambiguous, we conclude that the Court of Appeals was correct.

A. The language of the Bennett Amendment suggests an intention to incorporate only the affirmative defenses of the Equal Pay Act into Title VII. The Amendment bars sex-based wage discrimination claims under Title VII where the pay differential is "authorized" by the Equal Pay Act. Although the word "authorize" sometimes means simply "to permit," it ordinarily denotes affirmative enabling action. Black's Law Dictionary 122 (5th ed. 1979) defines "authorize" as "[t]o empower; to give a right or authority to act."9 Cf. 18 U.S.C. § 1905 (prohibiting the release by federal employees of certain information "to any extent not authorized by law"); 28 U.S.C. § 1343 (1976 ed., Supp.III) (granting district courts jurisdiction over "any civil action authorized by law"). The question, then, is what wage practices have been affirmatively authorized by the Equal Pay Act.

The Equal Pay Act is divided into two parts: a definition of the violation, followed by four affirmative defenses. The first part can hardly be said to "authorize" anything at all: it is purely prohibitory. The second part, however, in essence "authorizes" employers to differentiate in pay on the basis of seniority, merit, quantity or quality of production, or any other factor other than sex, even though such differentiation might otherwise violate the Act. It is to these provisions, therefore, that the Bennett Amendment must refer.

Petitioners argue that this construction of the Bennett Amendment would render it superfluous. See United States v. Menasche, 348 U.S. 528 (1955). Petitioners claim that the first three affirmative defenses are simply redundant of the provisions elsewhere in § 703(h) of Title VII that already exempt bona fide seniority and merit systems and systems measuring earnings by quantity or quality of production,10 and that the fourth defense—"any other factor other than sex"—is implicit in Title VII's general prohibition of sex-based discrimination.

We cannot agree. The Bennett Amendment was offered as a "technical amendment" designed to resolve any potential conflicts between Title VII and the Equal Pay Act. See infra, at 173. Thus, with respect to the first three defenses, the Bennett Amendment has the effect of guaranteeing that courts and administrative agencies adopt a consistent interpretation of like provisions in both statutes. Otherwise, they might develop inconsistent bodies of case law interpreting two sets of nearly identical language.

More importantly, incorporation of the fourth affirmative defense could have significant consequences for Title VII litigation. Title VII's prohibition of discriminatory employment practices was intended to be broadly inclusive, proscribing "not only overt discrimination but also practices that are fair in form, but discriminatory in operation." Griggs v. Duke Power Co., 401 U.S. 424, 431 (1971). The structure of Title VII litigation, including presumptions, burdens of proof, and defenses, has been designed to reflect this approach. The fourth affirmative defense of the Equal Pay Act, however, was designed differently, to confine the application of the Act to wage differentials attributable to sex discrimination. H.R. Rep. No. 309, 88th Cong., 1st Sess., 3 (1963), U.S.Code Cong. & Admin.News 1963, p. 687. Equal Pay Act litigation, therefore, has been structured to permit employers to defend against charges of discrimination where their pay differentials are based on a bona fide use of "other factors other than sex."11 Under the Equal Pay Act, the courts and administrative agencies are not permitted to "substitute their judgment for the judgment of the employer . . . who [has] established and applied a bona fide job rating system," so long as it does not discriminate on the basis of sex. 109 Cong.Rec. 9209 (1963) (statement of Rep. Goodell, principal exponent of the Act). Although we do not decide in this case how sex-based wage discrimination litigation under Title VII should be structured to accommodate the fourth affirmative defense of the Equal Pay Act, see n. 8, supra, we consider it clear that the Bennett Amendment, under this interpretation, is not rendered superfluous.

We therefore conclude that only differentials attributable to the four affirmative defenses of the Equal Pay Act are "authorized" by that Act within the meaning of § 703(h) of Title VII.

...

The [Equal Employment Opportunity] Commission's 1965 Guidelines on Discrimination Because of Sex stated that "the standards of 'equal pay for equal work' set forth in the Equal Pay Act for determining what is unlawful discrimination in compensation are applicable to Title VII." 29 CFR § 1604.7(a) (1966). In 1972, the EEOC deleted this portion of the Guideline, see 37 Fed.Reg. 6837 (1972). Although the original Guideline may be read to support petitioners' argument that no claim of sex discrimination in compensation may be brought under Title VII except where the Equal Pay Act's "equal work" standard is met, EEOC practice under this Guideline was considerably less than steadfast.

The restrictive interpretation suggested by the 1965 Guideline was followed in several opinion letters in the following years.17 During the same period, however, EEOC decisions frequently adopted the opposite position. For example, a reasonable-cause determination issued by the Commission in 1968 stated that "the existence of separate and different wage rate schedules for male employees on the one hand, and female employees on the other doing reasonably comparable work, establishes discriminatory wage rates based solely on the sex of the workers." Harrington v. Piccadilly Cafeteria, Case No. AU 7-3-173 (Apr. 25, 1968).18

The current Guideline does not purport to explain whether the equal work standard of the Equal Pay Act has any application to Title VII, see 29 CFR § 1604.8 (1980), but the EEOC now supports respondents' position in its capacity as amicus curiae. In light of this history, we feel no hesitation in adopting what seems to us the most persuasive interpretation of the Amendment, in lieu of that once espoused, but not consistently followed, by the Commission.

Rehnquist J (joined by Burger, Stewart and Powell) dissented:

Because I believe that the legislative history of both the Equal Pay Act of 1963 and Title VII clearly establishes that there can be no Title VII claim of sex-based wage discrimination without proof of "equal work," I dissent.

== Significance ==
Gunther did not prove definitive. The Court did not determine how jobs might be properly compared, and one of the primary opponents of the majority opinion was soon-to-be Chief Justice of the United States William Rehnquist. Rehnquist wrote explicitly against the comparable worth theory in his dissent (speaking as well for Warren E. Burger, Lewis F. Powell, Jr. and Potter Stewart), and Brennan countered that the majority opinion did not explicitly or implicitly support or refute the comparable worth doctrine. Gutman underscored that "the Gunther ruling did not validate comparable worth theory; it merely permitted plaintiffs to try to make the prima facie claim under Title VII rules." It added, "So far plaintiffs have been thwarted in every case."

== See also ==
- US labor law
