= Pell v. Procunier =

- Supreme Court of the United States

Decided June 24, 1974
- Full case name: Pell v. Procunier
- Citations: 417 U.S. 817 (more)

Holding
- When other channels for communication exist, restricting physical access of the media to incarcerated people is not unconstitutional.

Court membership
- Chief Justice Warren E. Burger Associate Justices William O. Douglas · William J. Brennan Jr. Potter Stewart · Byron White; Thurgood Marshall · Harry Blackmun; Lewis F. Powell Jr. · William Rehnquist

Case opinions
- Majority: Stewart
- Concur/dissent: Powell
- Dissent: Douglas, joined by Brennan, Marshall

Pell v. Procunier, 417 U.S. 817 (1974), was a United States Supreme Court case in which the court held that when other channels for communication exist, restricting physical access of the media to incarcerated people is not unconstitutional.

== Background ==
Four people incarcerated in California and three professional journalists brought suit in federal district court challenging the constitutionality of a regulation of the California Department of Corrections Manual (Section 415.071), which provides that "[p]ress and other media interviews with specific individual inmates will not be permitted." That provision was promulgated following a violent prison episode that the correction authorities attributed at least in part to the former policy of free face-to-face press interviews, which had resulted in a relatively small number of incarcerated people gaining disproportionate notoriety and influence among their fellows in the prison. The district court granted the incarcerated people's motion for summary judgment, holding that Section 415.071, insofar as it prohibited incarcerated people from having face-to-face communication with journalists, unconstitutionally infringed the inmates' First and Fourteenth Amendment freedoms. The court granted a motion to dismiss with respect to the claims of the media appellants, holding that their rights were not infringed, in view of their otherwise available rights to enter state institutions and interview inmates at random and the even broader access afforded prisoners by the court's ruling with respect to the incarcerated people. The prison officials (in Docket No. 73-754) and the journalists (in Docket No. 73-918) appealed to the Supreme Court.

== Opinion of the court ==
The Supreme Court issued an opinion on June 24, 1974. Although the court found that no constitutional rights had been infringed, the majority opinion suggests that visitation can be limited but that those limitations must have a legitimate basis and not be wholly arbitrary.

== Subsequent developments ==
This decision "largely replaced" earlier precedents supportive of prison reporting; subsequent court decisions also held that "the prison's security interests trumped the free speech rights of inmates" and that prisons could entirely forbid prison newspapers. Similar patterns and tensions emerged in other parts of the world, such as Canada. These pressures resulted in a quick and significant decline in the number of prison newspapers in publication between the 1970s and 1990s, with just six operating in 1998. However, more recently, "alongside a surge in bipartisan interest in criminal justice reform, prison journalism has reemerged and garnered the attention and support of funders, politicians, and the public". As of 2023 there are an estimated 24 prison newspapers in the US.
