= List of United States Supreme Court cases, volume 417 =

This is a list of all the United States Supreme Court cases from volume 417 of the United States Reports:

| Case name | Citation | Date decided |
|---|---|---|
| NLRB v. Food Store Employees | 417 U.S. 1 | 1974 |
| William E. Arnold Co. v. Carpenters | 417 U.S. 12 | 1974 |
| Blackledge v. Perry | 417 U.S. 21 | 1974 |
| Fuller v. Oregon | 417 U.S. 40 | 1974 |
| Kosydar v. National Cash Register Co. | 417 U.S. 62 | 1974 |
| Cass v. United States | 417 U.S. 72 | 1974 |
| Bellis v. United States | 417 U.S. 85 | 1974 |
| Cooper Stevedoring Co. v. Fritz Kopke, Inc. | 417 U.S. 106 | 1974 |
| F.D. Rich Co. v. United States ex rel. Industrial Lumber Co. | 417 U.S. 116 | 1974 |
| Commissioner v. National Alfalfa Dehydrating & Milling Co. | 417 U.S. 134 | 1974 |
| Eisen v. Carlisle & Jacquelin | 417 U.S. 156 | 1974 |
| Holder v. Banks | 417 U.S. 187 | 1974 |
| Corning Glass Works v. Brennan | 417 U.S. 188 | 1974 |
| Anderson v. United States | 417 U.S. 211 | 1974 |
| Howard Johnson Co. v. Hotel Employees | 417 U.S. 249 | 1974 |
| Vermont v. New York | 417 U.S. 270 | 1974 |
| Gerstein v. Coe | 417 U.S. 279 | 1974 |
| Poe v. Gerstein | 417 U.S. 281 | 1974 |
| Mobil Oil Corp. v. FPC | 417 U.S. 283 | 1974 |
| Davis v. United States (1974) | 417 U.S. 333 | 1974 |
| City of Pittsburgh v. Alco Parking Corp. | 417 U.S. 369 | 1974 |
| FPC v. Texaco Inc. | 417 U.S. 380 | 1974 |
| Wheeler v. Barrera | 417 U.S. 402 | 1974 |
| Michigan v. Tucker | 417 U.S. 433 | 1974 |
| Baker v. Gold Seal Liquors, Inc. | 417 U.S. 467 | 1974 |
| Geduldig v. Aiello | 417 U.S. 484 | 1974 |
| Scherk v. Alberto-Culver Co. | 417 U.S. 506 | 1974 |
| Morton v. Mancari | 417 U.S. 535 | 1974 |
| Gilmore v. Montgomery | 417 U.S. 556 | 1974 |
| Cardwell v. Lewis | 417 U.S. 583 | 1974 |
| Ross v. Moffitt | 417 U.S. 600 | 1974 |
| Moody v. Albemarle Paper Co. | 417 U.S. 622 | 1974 |
| Jimenez v. Weinberger | 417 U.S. 628 | 1974 |
| Kokoszka v. Belford | 417 U.S. 642 | 1974 |
| Warden v. Marrero | 417 U.S. 653 | 1974 |
| Central Tablet Mfg. Co. v. United States | 417 U.S. 673 | 1974 |
| Bangor Punta Operations, Inc. v. Bangor & A.R.R. Co. | 417 U.S. 703 | 1974 |
| Parker v. Levy | 417 U.S. 733 | 1974 |
| Florida Power & Light Co. v. Electrical Workers | 417 U.S. 790 | 1974 |
| Pell v. Procunier | 417 U.S. 817 | 1974 |
| Saxbe v. Washington Post Co. | 417 U.S. 843 | 1974 |
| Warm Springs Dam Task Force v. Gribble | 417 U.S. 1301 | 1974 |
