= Bennett Amendment =

American labor law provision

The Bennett Amendment is a United States labor law provision in the Title VII of the Civil Rights Act of 1964, §703(h) passed to limit sex discrimination claims regarding pay to the rules in the Equal Pay Act of 1963. It says an employer can "differentiate upon the basis of sex" when it compensates employees "if such differentiation is authorized by" the Equal Pay Act.

The Bennett Amendment has been criticized for its poor drafting, and lack of discussion in Congress. It has also invited debate on the extent to which it impacts the question of "comparable worth" such as whether or not lawsuits may be brought when jobs are different but are judged by contrast on an importance continuum to jobs of higher pay. In 1981, the Supreme Court of the United States determined with respect to County of Washington v. Gunther that the Bennett Amendment explicitly incorporated only limited defenses to unequal pay and did not otherwise bar suits based on a comparison of payment for different jobs. Nevertheless, the amendment has continued to be used to bar comparable worth suits in lower courts.

== Background ==
Title VII forbids employers to discriminate against employees on the basis of sex, but the Bennett Amendment (proposed as Public Law 88-38 on June 10, 1963) provides exceptions by specifically noting:

It shall not be an unlawful employment practice under this subchapter for any employer to differentiate upon the basis of sex in determining the amount of the wages or compensation paid or to be paid to employees of such employer if such differentiation is authorized by the provisions of section 206(d) of title 29 [section 6(d) of the Fair Labor Standards Act of 1938, as amended].

§206(d) of the Equal Pay Act allows differentiation of payment on (1) seniority, (2) merit, (3) productivity, or (4) any other factor than sex.

According to the Employee Benefits Law 2004, the amendment was proposed by Wallace F. Bennett, a Republican Senator from Utah as a "'technical' amendment" to bring the Civil Rights Act and the Equal Pay Act into accord.

== Comparable worth debate ==
Arthur Gutman in EEO Law and Personnel Practices (1999) describes comparable worth as a system of ranking jobs on "a continuum of value to the company" that allowed one job may be worth $10 an hour, but a job of slightly less complexity might be worth $8. Evaluating that continuum provides an "internal worth," which is indicative of the value of the job to a particular company, and may be compared to an "external worth," the value of a job to the wider market.

The impact of the Bennett Amendment on the comparable worth debate has been a point of contention. In 1989, Ellen Frankel Paul summarized the matter in Equity and Gender: The Comparable Worth Debate, by posing two questions: "Does the Bennett Amendment plug into Title VII all of the Equal Pay Act's standards, thus importing the "equal work" standard of the latter? Or does it merely inject the Equal Pay Act's four exceptions...?" Paul noted that the question is pivotal to resolving the Comparable Worth Debate since if it is interpreted to incorporate the entirety of the Equal Pay Act's standards, it becomes impossible to prove a "comparable worth" suit by defining two different jobs in a scale of importance and determining by it how to judge equal pay.

=== County of Washington v. Gunther ===
The Supreme Court of the United States first examined the question of the impact of the Bennett Amendment in the 1981 case County of Washington v. Gunther, 452 U.S. 161. The case originated in 1974 in Oregon, when a group of four female county prison guards sued the County of Washington for unequal wages and alleged that their pay was less than that of male guards for no reason other than sexual discrimination. The district court disagreed by finding that male guards were responsible for overseeing more prisoners and also that female guards spent some of their time in clerical tasks. However, it also found as a matter of law that a sex-based wage discrimination claim cannot be brought under Title VII unless it satisfies the equal work standard of the Equal Pay Act of 1963.

While not reviewing the first finding, the Ninth Circuit Court of Appeals held with respect to the latter that "claims for sex-based wage discrimination can also be brought under Title VII even though no member of the opposite sex holds an equal but higher paying job, provided that the challenged wage rate is not exempted under the Equal Pay Act's affirmative defenses as to wage differentials attributable to seniority, merit, quantity or quality of production, or any other factor other than sex." It interpreted the intention of the amendment as incorporating "into Title VII only the affirmative defenses of the Equal Pay Act, not its prohibitory language requiring equal pay for equal work."

By a narrow margin, the US Supreme Court concurred with that finding. Justice Brennan, speaking for the Court, indicated that the Bennett Amendment did not preclude comparison of differences in pay but only those attributable to those four specific factors.

Gunther, however, did not prove as definitive on the question as was first believed because it did not address all of the factors under consideration, and it was a narrow decision. The Court did not determine how jobs might be properly compared, and one of the primary opponents of the majority opinion was soon-to-be Chief Justice of the United States William Rehnquist. Rehnquist wrote explicitly against the comparable worth theory in his dissent (speaking as well for Warren E. Burger, Lewis F. Powell, Jr. and Potter Stewart), and Brennan countered that the majority opinion was not explicitly or implicitly supporting or refuting the comparable worth doctrine. Gutman underscored that "the Gunther ruling did not validate comparable worth theory but merely permitted plaintiffs to try to make the prima facie claim under Title VII rules." He added, "So far plaintiffs have been thwarted in every case."

== See also ==
- US labor law
- Schultz v. Wheaton Glass Co.
