= Corning Glass Works v. Brennan =

- Supreme Court of the United States

Decided June 3, 1974
- Full case name: Corning Glass Works v. Brennan
- Citations: 417 U.S. 188 (more)

Holding
- Although women plaintiffs worked at different times in the day, compared to male colleagues, the working conditions were "sufficiently similar" and the discrimination claim was allowed. "Working conditions" means both "surroundings" and "hazards."

Court membership
- Chief Justice Warren E. Burger Associate Justices William O. Douglas · William J. Brennan Jr. Potter Stewart · Byron White; Thurgood Marshall · Harry Blackmun; Lewis F. Powell Jr. · William Rehnquist

Case opinions
- Majority: Marshall
- Dissent: Burger, joined by Blackmun, Rehnquist
- Stewart took no part in the consideration or decision of the case.

Corning Glass Works v. Brennan, 417 U.S. 188 (1974), was a United States Supreme Court case in which the Court interpreted the Equal Pay Act of 1963 and held that Corning Glass Works violated the Act by paying male night shift inspectors higher wages than female day shift inspectors performing the same work. The decision was the Supreme Court's first ruling applying the Equal Pay Act.

== Background ==
=== Historical Context ===
The Equal Pay Act of 1963 was signed into law by President John F. Kennedy on June 10, 1963, as part of his New Frontier program. The legislation was enacted as an amendment to the Fair Labor Standards Act of 1938 and aimed to abolish wage disparity based on sex. The Act prohibits employers from paying employees of one sex less than employees of the opposite sex for equal work on job requiring equal skill, effort, and responsibility performed under similar working condition.

Before the Act's passage, labor activist Esther Peterson, who headed the Women’s Bureau in the Department of Labor, played a crucial role in bringing the legislation before Congress. At her urging, President Kennedy established the Presidential Commission on the Status of Women to develop recommendations for achieving equality. The original draft bill called for equal pay for "comparable work," but this language was eventually changed to "equal work"—meaning jobs requiring equal skill, effort, and responsibility performed under similar working conditions—to garner sufficient support for passage.

=== Employment Practices at Corning Glass Works ===
Corning Glass Works operated production plants in Corning, New York and Wellsboro, Pennsylvania. Prior to 1925, the company operated its plants only during the day, and all inspection work was performed by women. Between 1925 and 1930, the company began to introduce automatic production equipment that made it desirable to institute a night shift.

During this period, both New York and Pennsylvania law prohibited women from working at night. As a result, in order to fill inspector positions on the new night shift, the company had to recruit male employees from among its male day workers. The male employees transferred to night inspection demanded and received wages substantially higher than those paid to women inspectors on the day shifts. During this same period, no plant-wide shift differential existed, and male employees working at night in positions other than inspection received the same wages as their day shift counterparts.

This arrangement created a situation where night inspectors were exclusively male, day inspectors were exclusively female, and male inspectors received significantly higher wages for performing the same inspection work.

=== Union Organization and Subsequent Changes ===
In 1944, Corning plants at both locations were organized by the American Flint Glass Workers' Union, and a collective-bargaining agreement was negotiated for all production and maintenance employees. This agreement established a plant-wide shift differential for the first time, but this change did not eliminate the higher base wage paid to male night inspectors. Rather, the shift differential was superimposed on existing difference in base wages between male night inspectors and female day inspectors.

After the Equal Pay Act's effective date of June 11, 1964, the laws in both Pennsylvania and New York were amended to permit women to work at night. Beginning in 1966, Corning started to open night shift jobs to women. Previously separate male and female seniority lists were consolidated, and women became eligible to exercise their seniority, on the same basis as men, to bid for the higher-paid night inspection jobs as vacancies occurred.

On January 20, 1969, a new collective-bargaining agreement established a "job evaluation" system for setting wage rates. The new agreement abolished separate base wages for day and night shift inspectors hired after that date, imposing a uniform base wage for inspectors exceeding the previous night shift rate. However, employees hired before January 20, 1969, when working as inspectors on the night shift, were to receive a higher "red circle" rate, which served to perpetuate the differential in base wages between day and night inspectors.

== Legal Proceedings ==
=== Lower Court Decisions ===
The Secretary of Labor brought two actions against Corning, seeking to enjoin the company from violating the Equal Pay Act and to collect back wages allegedly due to female employees because of past violations. The cases proceeded through different federal circuits with conflicting results.

In Case No. 73-29, involving Corning plants in Corning, New York, the District Court granted relief, and the United States Court of Appeals for the Second Circuit affirmed, concluding that Corning's practice violated the Act.

In Case No. 73-695, involving the Corning plants in Wellsboro, Pennsylvania, the District Court held that the Act had not been violated, and the United States Court of Appeals for the Third Circuit affirmed.

The Third Circuit relied heavily on a statement by Charles Goodell, a sponsor of the Equal Pay bill, who commented during floor debate that "standing as opposed to sitting, pleasantness or unpleasantness of surroundings, periodic rest periods, hours of work, difference in shift, all would logically fall within the working condition factor."

The Supreme Court granted certiorari and consolidated the cases to resolve this direct conflict between the two circuits.

== Supreme Court Decision ==
=== Majority Opinion ===
Justice Thurgood Marshall delivered the opinion of the Court, joined by Justices William O. Douglas, William J. Brennan Jr., Byron White, and Lewis F. Powell Jr.

The Court addressed three distinct questions: (1) whether Corning ever violated the Equal Pay Act by paying male night shift inspectors more than female day shift inspectors; (2) if so, whether Corning cured its violation in 1966 by permitting women to work as night shift inspectors; and (3) whether the violation was remedied in 1969 by equalizing day and night inspector wage rates while establishing higher "red circle" rates for existing night shift employees.

=== Interpretation of "Working Conditions" ===
The Court held that the term "working conditions" in the Equal Pay Act encompasses physical surroundings and hazards, not the time of day worked. In reaching this conclusion, the Court examined the legislative history of the Act, noting that Congress amended the bill's definition of equal work in response to testimony from industry representatives who used formal job evaluation plans.

The Court observed that Congress incorporated into the Act the well-defined principles of job evaluation, specifically the concepts of "skill," "effort," "responsibility," and "working conditions." In the specialized language of job evaluation systems, "working conditions" comprises two subfactors: "surroundings" (measuring elements such as toxic chemicals or fumes regularly encountered by a worker) and "hazards" (taking into account physical hazards regularly encountered). Nowhere in these definitions is time of day worked mentioned as a relevant criterion.

The Court noted that Corning's own job evaluation plans had consistently treated day and night inspection work as equal in all respects, including working conditions. Corning's Manager of Job Evaluation had testified that time of day worked was not considered to be a "working condition."

=== Finding of Violation ===
The Court found that Corning violated the Act during the period from its effective date to June 1966. The record supported the conclusion that the higher base wage for the previously all-male night inspection work was not intended to serve as added compensation for night work but rather reflected a job market in which Corning could pay women less than men for the same work.

The Court stated that the differential "arose simply because men would not work at the low rates paid women inspectors, and it reflected a job market in which Corning could pay women less than men for the same work."

=== Failure to Remedy ===
The Court held that Corning did not cure its violation in June 1966 by permitting women to work as night shift inspectors.[7] The Court agreed with all other circuits that had considered the issue that the company could not cure its violation except by equalizing the base wages of female day inspectors with the higher rates paid to night inspectors.

The Court emphasized that Congress enacted the Equal Pay Act "recognizing the weaker bargaining position of many women and believing that discrimination in wage rates represented unfair employer exploitation of this source of cheap labor." The statutory proviso requiring that violations not be cured by reducing the higher wage meant that "the lower wage rate must be increased to the level of the higher."

Finally, the Court held that the violation was not cured in 1969 when Corning equalized day and night inspector wage rates because the "red circle" rate perpetuated the discrimination. Had the company equalized base-wage rates on the effective date of the Act as required, the day inspectors would have been entitled to the same higher "red circle" rate granted to night inspectors.

The Court concluded that "the company's continued discrimination in base wages between night and day workers, though phrased in terms of a neutral factor other than sex, nevertheless operated to perpetuate the effects of the company's prior illegal practice of paying women less than men for equal work."

=== Dissent ===
Chief Justice Warren E. Burger, Justice Harry A. Blackmun, and Justice William H. Rehnquist dissented. They would have affirmed the judgment of the Court of Appeals for the Third Circuit and reversed the judgment of the Court of Appeals for the Second Circuit for the reasons stated by Judge Adams in his opinion for the Third Circuit. Justice Potter Stewart took no part in the consideration or decision of the cases.

== Significance ==
The Supreme Court's decision in Corning Glass Works v. Brennan was the first applying the Equal Pay Act of 1963 and had significant impact on the future interpretation and application of the statute. The case resulted in a settlement of approximately one million dollars in back wages.

The decision established several important precedents for employment discrimination law. First, it clarified that the term "working conditions" under the Equal Pay Act refers to physical surroundings and hazards, not to the time of day when work is performed. Second, it established that where an employer utilizes a bona fide industrial job evaluation plan, that plan should be used as a guide to determine whether jobs are "equal" for purposes of the Equal Pay Act. Third, it confirmed that violations of the Equal Pay Act can only be cured by raising the lower wage to match the higher wage, not by reducing anyone's compensation.

The case reinforced the Supreme Court's view that the Equal Pay Act must be broadly construed to achieve Congress's goal of remedying sexual discrimination in wages.
