= Aurel S. Croissant =

Aurel Croissant
- Born: 1969 (age 56–57)

Academic background
- Education: University of Mainz

Academic work
- Institutions: University of Heidelberg
- Main interests: Political science

Aurel Croissant (born 1969) is a German Professor of Political Science at Heidelberg University in Heidelberg, Germany, where he researches democracy, authoritarianism, civil-military relations, terrorism, political violence, and Asian politics. He is also the Editor-in-Chief of the journal Democratization.

== Background ==
Croissant received his MA in Political Science, Sociology and Public Law from the University of Mainz in 1996, and his Doctor of Philosophy in Political Science in 2001, also from the University of Mainz. During his Master and Ph.D. program, he was an adjunct researcher and lecturer at the Universities of Mainz and Heidelberg.

== Career ==
After completing his Ph.D. in 2001, Croissant took a job at Heidelberg University as a Senior Lecturer, before accepting a tenure-track position as Assistant Professor for Comparative Politics at the Naval Postgraduate School in Monterey, CA. In 2006, he became a Full Professor of Political Science at Heidelberg University, a position he holds today. From 2023 to 2025, he was appointed Frontier 10-10 Professor at Ewha Womans University, Seoul. He was also a Visiting Professor at National Taiwan University (2023-2025) and is Honorary Professor at Chulalongkorn University, Bangkok (since 2026).

Since 2012, he has been Editor in Chief (with Jeffrey Haynes) of the journal Democratization and is on the editorial boards of the Asian Journal of Political Science, Armed Forces & Society, and the Journal of Contemporary Southeast Asian Affairs. Croissant is a member of the academic advisory boards of the German Institute for Global Affairs (GIGA), the Stiftung Wissenschaft und Politik (SWP), the Zentrum für Militärgeschichte und Sozialwissenschaften der Bundeswehr (ZMSBw), the Sustainable Governance Indicators (SGI), and the Bertelsmann Transformation-Index (BTI).

He has been or is a Fellow of the East West Center Honolulu, the East Asia Foundation, the Taiwan Foundation, the National Endowment of Democracy, the Center for Asia-Pacific Resilience and Innovation, and the Korea Foundation. While at Heidelberg University, Croissant has held numerous elected and appointed positions at the university; he has served as the Director for the Institute of Political Science, Dean of the Faculty of Economics and Social Sciences, and a Senator for Heidelberg University.

He has taught over two dozen classes over a variety of subjects and has been a reviewer for over forty journals and publishing companies.

== Research ==
Croissant’s research focuses on topics such as the comparative analysis of political structures and processes in East- and Southeast Asia, autocracy, civil-military relations, terrorism, and political violence.

His research has appeared in more than 300 scholarly publications in German, English, Indonesian, Russian, and Spanish, including several monographs and edited volumes and articles in journals such as Party Politics, Democratization, Journal of Democracy, Electoral Studies, Armed Forces & Society, Pacific Review, Japanese Journal of Political Science, Journal of East Asian Studies, Contemporary Southeast Asia, Political Studies, Contemporary Politics, Terrorism and Political Violence, Studies in Conflict and Terrorism, Asian Survey, and Journal of Global Security Studies. His recent book publications include Dictators’ Endgames (Oxford: Oxford University Press with Tanja Eschenauer-Engler and David Kuehn, 2024), Research Handbook of Civil-Military Relations (Cheltenham and Northhampton: Edward Elgar, edited with David Kuehn and David Pion-Berlin, 2024), and The Routledge Handbook of Autocratization (London and New York: Routledge, edited with Luca Tomini, 2024).

== Notable publications ==
- Croissant, A., T. Eschenauer-Engler, and D. Kuehn. Dictators’ Endgames. Oxford University Press.
- Kuehn, D., and A. Croissant. Routes to Reform. Civil-Military Relations and Democracy in the Third Wave. Oxford University Press. (Guiseppe Carforio ERGOMAS Award for the Best Book 2024, European Research Group on Military and Society, Ergomas)
- Croissant, A. and L. Tomini (eds.). The Routledge Handbook of Autocratization. New York and London: Routledge.
- Croissant, A., D. Kuehn, and D. Pion-Berlin (eds.) Edward Elgar Research Handbook on Civil-Military Relations. London: Edward Elgar.
- Croissant, A. and O. Hellmann (eds.). Stateness and Democracy in East Asia. New York: Cambridge University Press.
- Bruneau, T. C. and A. Croissant (eds.), Civil-Military Relations: Control and Effectiveness Across Regimes. Boulder: Lynne Rienner
- Croissant, A., D. Kuehn, P. Lorenz and P.W. Chambers, Civilian Control and Democracy in Asia, Basingstoke/New York: Palgrave.
- Croissant, A. & Lott, L., “Democratic Resilience in the Twenty-First Century. Search for an analytical framework and explorative analysis”, Political Studies, DOI: 10.1177/00323217251345779
- Croissant, A. & Kuehn, D., “Soldiers and Autocratization: Explaining varieties of military roles in post-Cold War Asia”. Journal of Global Security Studies (DOI: 10.1093/jogss/ogae046)
- Bayer, M.; Croissant, A.; Izadi, R. and N. Scheeder. “Multidimensional Measures of Militarization (M3) - A Global Dataset”. Armed Forces & Society, DOI: 10.1177/0095327X231215295/
- Croissant, A. Comparative Politics of Southeast Asia. An Introduction. Second, updated and extended edition. Springer
- Croissant, A. Civil-Military Relations in Southeast Asia. Cambridge University Press.
- Croissant, A., “Riding the Tiger. Civilian Control and the Military in Democratizing Korea”, Armed Forces & Society, 30(3), 357-382.
- Croissant, A., D. Kuehn, P.W. Chambers and S.O Wolf, “Conceptualizing Civil-military Relations in Emerging Democracies”, European Political Science, 10: 137-145.
