= Hans-Jürgen Puhle =

German historian

Hans-Jürgen Puhle (born 8 October 1940 in Środa Śląska) is a German historian and political scientist.
