= Garry Rodan =

Australian academic

Garry Rodan FASSA is an Australian academic who has been an emeritus professor at Murdoch University since 1 April 2019.

Rodan served as the director of the Asia Research Centre at Murdoch (2002–2009, 2016–March 2019) and professor of politics and international studies (2002–March 2019). He is also an elected Fellow of the Academy of the Social Sciences in Australia.

Since 1 July 2019, Rodan has been an Honorary Professor of The University of Queensland in the School of Political Science and International Studies.

== Research ==
Rodan has written extensively on Singapore's political and economic development and more generally on democratization and its problems in Asia, the changing nature of authoritarian rule, and on theoretical approaches for understanding development in the region.This includes over 250 publications encompassing books, articles, chapters and opinion pieces for the media.

Rodan's research has included examination of the political economy of the international media in various parts of East and Southeast Asia, the political impact of the Internet, the implications of transparency reform in the region for politics, and the emergence of non-democratic institutions and ideologies of accountability and representation.

== Books ==
- Civil Society in Southeast Asia: Power Struggles and Political Regimes (New York: Cambridge University Press, 2022)
- Participation without Democracy: Containing Conflict in Southeast Asia (Ithaca: Cornell University Press, 2018)
- The Politics of Accountability in Southeast Asia: The Dominance of Moral Ideologies (Oxford: Oxford University Press, 2014) [co-authored with Caroline Hughes]
- The Political Economy of South-East Asia: Markets, power and contestation (Melbourne: Oxford University Press, 2006) [co-edited with K. Hewison & R Robison]
- Neoliberalism and Conflict in Asia after 9/11 (London & New York: RoutledgeCurzon (2006, paperback 2009) [co-editor with K. Hewison]
- Transparency and Authoritarian Rule in Southeast Asia (RoutledgeCurzon 2004)
- Political Economy of Southeast Asia: Conflict, Crises, and Change (Oxford University Press 1997, Revised editions 2001 and 2006)
- Singapore, International Library of Social Change in Asia-Pacific Series (Aldershot: Ashgate, 2001) [editor]
- The Political Economy of South-East Asia: An Introduction (Melbourne: Oxford University Press, 1997) [joint editor with K.Hewison & R.Robison]
- Political Oppositions in Industrialising Asia (London & New York: Routledge, 1996) [editor]
- Southeast Asia in the 1990s: Authoritarianism, Democracy and Capitalism (Sydney: Allen & Unwin, 1993) [joint editor with K. Hewison & R.Robison]
- Singapore Changes Guard: Social, Political and Economic Directions in the 1990s (Melbourne: Longman Cheshire, 1993) [editor]
- The Political Economy of Singapore's Industrialization: National State and International Capital (London: Macmillan; New York: St Martin's Press, 1989) Translated into Japanese by Keiko Tsuji Tamura for San'ichi Press, Tokyo, 1992.
