= Equal Pay Act of 1963 =

United States labor law of the New Frontier program

The Equal Pay Act of 1963
- Acronyms (colloquial): EPA
- Enacted by: the 88th United States Congress

Citations
- Public law: Pub. L. 88–38
- Statutes at Large: 77 Stat. 56

Codification
- Acts amended: Fair Labor Standards Act
- Titles amended: 29
- U.S.C. sections amended: 206

Legislative history
- Introduced in the Senate as S. 1409 by Patrick McNamara (D–MI); Passed the House on May 23, 1963 (362–9); Signed into law by President John F. Kennedy on June 10, 1963

United States Supreme Court cases
- Corning Glass Works v. Brennan, 417 U.S. 188 (1974); Los Angeles Dept. of Water and Power v. Manhart, 435 U.S. 702 (1978); Northwest Airlines, Inc. v. Transport Workers, 451 U.S. 77 (1981); County of Washington v. Gunther, 452 U.S. 161 (1981); Arizona Governing Comm. for Tax Deferred Annuity and Deferred Compensation Plans v. Norris, 463 U.S. 1073 (1983)

The Equal Pay Act of 1963 is a United States labor law amending the Fair Labor Standards Act, aimed at abolishing wage disparity based on sex (see gender pay gap). It was signed into law on June 10, 1963, by John F. Kennedy as part of his New Frontier Program. In passing the bill, Congress stated that sex discrimination:

- depresses wages and living standards for employees necessary for their health and efficiency;
- prevents the maximum utilization of the available labor resources;
- tends to cause labor disputes, thereby burdening, affecting, and obstructing commerce;
- burdens commerce and the free flow of goods in commerce; and
- constitutes an unfair method of competition.

The law provides in part that "No employer having employees subject to any provisions of this section [section 206 of title 29 of the United States Code] shall discriminate, within any establishment in which such employees are employed, between employees on the basis of sex by paying wages to employees in such establishment at a rate less than the rate at which he pays wages to employees of the opposite sex in such establishment for equal work on jobs[,] the performance of which requires equal skill, effort, and responsibility, and which are performed under similar working conditions, except where such payment is made pursuant to (i) a seniority system; (ii) a merit system; (iii) a system which measures earnings by quantity or quality of production; or (iv) a differential based on any other factor other than sex [...]."

== Background ==
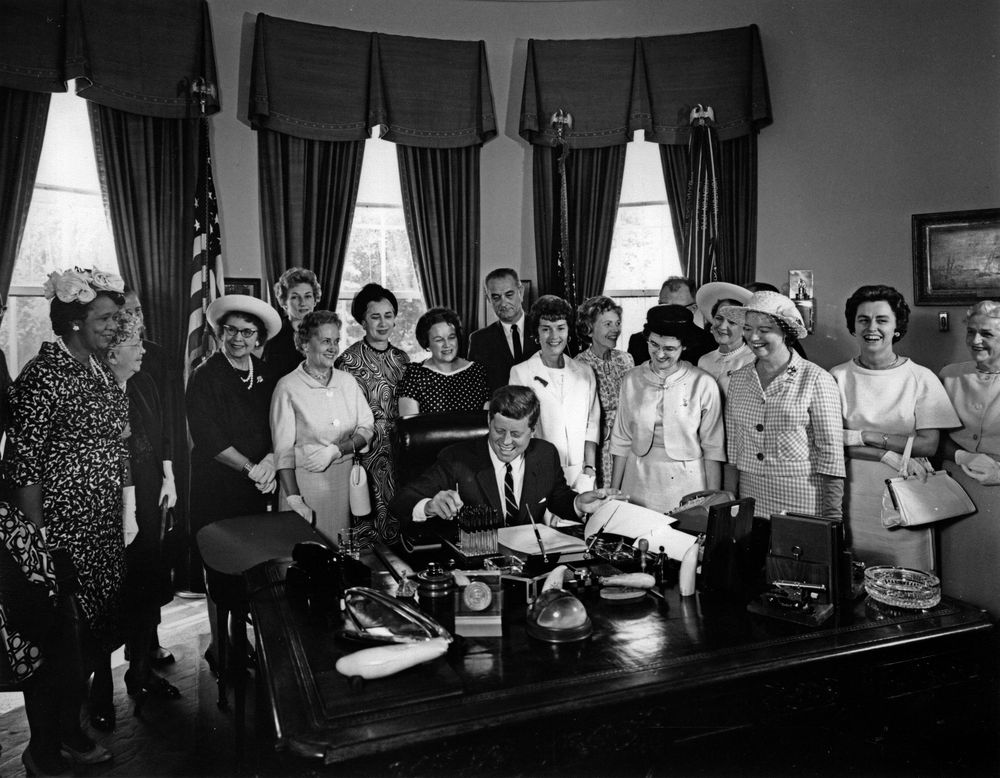
American Association of University Women members with President John F. Kennedy as he signs the Equal Pay Act into law

In 1944, Republican congresswoman Winifred C. Stanley from Buffalo, N.Y. introduced H.R. 5056, Prohibiting Discrimination in Pay on Account of Sex, which did not pass at the time. The issue languished until 10 June 1963, when Congress passed the Equal Pay Act ("EPA" or the "Act") as an amendment to the Fair Labor Standards Act, to "prohibit discrimination on account of sex in the payment of wages by employers."

Congress included within the text of the EPA a clear and concise policy statement and briefly described the problems it was intended to remedy. The clear statement of Congressional intent and policy guiding the EPA’s enactment indicate the Congressional desire to fashion a broad remedial framework to protect employees from wage discrimination on the basis of sex. The Supreme Court has expressly recognized the view that the EPA must be broadly construed to achieve Congress’ goal of remedying sexual discrimination. Congress passed the EPA out of "concern for the weaker bargaining position of women" to provide a remedy to discriminatory wage structures that reflect "an ancient but outmoded belief that a man, because of his role in society, should be paid more than a woman." The EPA protects both men and women. It also protects administrative, professional and executive employees who are exempt under the Fair Labor Standards Act.

The EPA, Section 206(d)(1), prohibits "employer[s] ... [from] discriminat[ing] … on the basis of sex by paying wages to employees [...] at a rate less than the rate [paid] to employees of the opposite sex [...] for equal work on jobs [requiring] equal skill, effort, and responsibility, and which are performed under similar working conditions[.]" To establish a prima facie case under the EPA, an employee must show that:

1. different wages are paid to employees of the opposite sex;
2. the employees perform substantially equal work on jobs requiring equal skill, effort, and responsibility; and
3. the jobs are performed under similar working conditions.

The EPA provides that the employer may not pay lower wages to employees of one gender than it pays to employees of the other gender, employees within the same establishment for equal work at jobs that require equal skill, effort, and responsibility, and that are performed under similar working conditions.

The EPA does not contain any intent requirement within the statutory language. Liability under the EPA is established by meeting the three elements of the prima facie case, regardless of the intention of the employer. As such, the EPA imposes strict liability on employers who engage in wage discrimination on the basis of sex.

Once a plaintiff meets her or his heavy burden and establishes a prima facie case of gender discrimination under the EPA, then the defendant may avoid liability only by proving the existence of one of four statutory affirmative defenses. The EPA’s four affirmative defenses allow unequal pay for equal work when the wages are set "pursuant to (i) a seniority system; (ii) a merit system; (iii) a system which measures earnings by quantity or quality of production; or (iv) ... any other factor other than sex[.]"

== Congressional intent ==
Upon its initial enactment, the EPA was "the first step towards an adjustment of balance in pay for women.” As a part of the Fair Labor Standards Act of 1938, the EPA was subject to the scope and exceptions of covered employees and employers contained within that act. On the floor of the House of Representatives, many Representatives voiced their concern that the EPA should act as the starting point for establishing pay parity for women. Subsequent to the enactment of the EPA, Congress undertook two actions which broadened the scope of federal protection against wage discrimination on the basis of sex.

First, the same 88th Congress enacted Title VII of the Civil Rights Act of 1964. By including sex as an element protected from discrimination, Title VII expanded the protection of women from employment discrimination, to include almost all employees working for employers with fifteen or more employees. Foreseeing the potential conflict between the administration of two statutes with overlapping restrictions, Congress included the Bennett Amendment in Title VII of the Civil Rights Act of 1964, which incorporates the EPA’s four affirmative defenses into Title VII.

Second, Congress expanded the EPA’s coverage to professionals and other white-collar employees. For the first nine years of the EPA, the requirement of equal pay for equal work did not extend to persons employed in an executive, administrative or professional capacity, or as an outside salesperson. Therefore, the EPA exempted white-collar women from the protection of equal pay for equal work. In 1972, Congress enacted the Education Amendments of 1972, which amended the FLSA to expand the coverage of the EPA to these employees, by excluding the EPA from the professional workers exemption of the FLSA.

=== Congress' consideration of economic consequences ===
The Congress did not ignore the EPA’s economic consequences on the salaries and employment opportunities for both men and women. First, as an amendment of the FLSA, the EPA is part of the same legislative structure that houses the federal minimum wage laws. The EPA acts as a wage equalizer between men and women for equal jobs, and has the potential of acting as a price floor on the salaries of men or women for particular jobs. Economists, such as Thomas Sowell have asserted the EPA causes unemployment, and additional discrimination against women by excluding them from the labor market. Second, several Representatives voiced their concerns that the negative impact of setting price floors on the wages paid to women would reduce the availability of jobs for women. With the possible side effects of the Act noted on the Congressional record, the Act passed with little opposition, and no indication that any of the four affirmative defenses were intended to remedy or limit its negative consequences.

== Impact ==
=== Earnings gap ===
Average American women’s salaries have risen relative to men's since the EPA’s enactment, from 62.3% of men’s earnings in 1979 to 81.1% in 2018.

=== Further legislation ===
The EPA did not originally cover executives, administrators, outside salespeople, and professionals, but the Education Amendments of 1972 amended the EPA so that it does.

In 2005, Senator Hillary Clinton introduced the "Paycheck Fairness Act," which proposed to amend the EPA’s fourth affirmative defense to permit only bona fide factors other than sex that are job-related or serve a legitimate business interest. Representative Rosa DeLauro first introduced an identical bill in the House of Representatives on the same day.

In 2007, the Supreme Court restricted the applicable statute of limitations for equal pay claims in Ledbetter v. Goodyear. On January 29, 2009, President Barack Obama signed into law the Lilly Ledbetter Fair Pay Act, in response to the Court's holding in this case. This bill, providing that each gender-unequal paycheck is a new violation of the law, was the first bill signed by President Obama.

=== Public awareness efforts ===
In a renowned effort to promote public awareness of the EPA, Yvonne Craig, reprising her role as Batgirl, would in 1973 appear in televised a public service announcement seeking to educate the general public about the law. In the psa, which was sponsored by the U.S. Department of Labor Wage and Hour Division, Batgirl demanded Batman that he finally give her equal pay, as required by the Equal Pay Act and like he pays Robin, in order to rescue Batman and Robin as they were tied up and strapped to a bomb, and further noted the rights guaranteed by the law.

=== Enforcement ===
Initially, a 2007 study commissioned by the Department of Labor cautioned against overzealous application of the EPA without closer examination of possible reasons for pay discrepancies. This study noted, for example, that men as a group earn higher wages in part because men dominate blue collar jobs, which are more likely to require cash payments for overtime work; in contrast, women comprise over half of the salaried white collar management workforce that is often exempted from overtime laws. In summary, the study stated: "Although additional research in this area is clearly needed, this study leads to the unambiguous conclusion that the differences in the compensation of men and women are the result of a multitude of factors and that the raw wage gap should not be used as the basis to justify corrective action. Indeed, there may be nothing to correct. The differences in raw wages may be almost entirely the result of the individual choices being made by both male and female workers."

However, later, in 2021, a Department of Labor blogpost observed, "Women earn less than their same race and ethnicity counterpart at every level of educational attainment - Compared with white men with the same education, Black and Latina women with only a bachelor's degree have the largest gap at 65%, and Black women with advanced degrees earn 70% of what white men with advanced degrees earn. Educational attainment is not enough to close gender earnings gaps. In fact, most women with advanced degrees earn less than white men, on average, with only a bachelor's degree."

=== Outside the United States ===
The Equal Pay Act 1970 was an Act of the Parliament of the United Kingdom that prohibited any less favourable treatment between men and women in terms of pay and conditions of employment. The Equal Pay Act 1970 has now been mostly superseded by Part 5, chapter 3, of the Equality Act 2010.

== See also ==
- Economic inequality
- Equal Pay Act 1970, the United Kingdom legislation which was influenced by the Equal Pay Act of 1963
- Equal pay for equal work
- United States labor law

== Notes ==
Department of Labor equal pay infographic created for the 50th anniversary of the legislation
