= Democratic backsliding in the United States =

The V-Dem Institute uses "electoral democracy" to refer to politicians being responsive to voters and media freedom, and uses "liberal democracy" to refer to checks and balances on executive power and the protection of individual rights against tyrannical rule. The V-Dem Institute said in 2026 that "the speed with which American democracy is currently dismantled is unprecedented in modern history". The institute noted executive overreach undermining the rule of law, suppression and intimidation of the media and dissenting voices, loss of legislative constraints, and declining civil rights, equality, and freedom of expression, reaching a 50-year low.

Democratic backsliding has been identified as a trend in the United States at the state and national levels in various indices and analyses, primarily during the Jim Crow era and in the 21st century under Donald Trump. It is "a process of regime change towards autocracy that makes the exercise of political power more arbitrary and repressive, and that restricts the space for public contestation and political participation in the process of government selection".

The Jim Crow era is among the most-cited historical examples of democratic backsliding, with Black Americans in particular seeing their rights eroded dramatically, especially in the Southern United States. Backsliding in the 21st century has been discussed as largely a Republican-led phenomenon, with particular emphasis placed on the administrations of Donald Trump.

Drivers include decisions made by the Supreme Court under John Roberts (especially those regarding money in politics and gerrymandering), attempts at election subversion, and the concentration of political power among the ultra-wealthy (plutocracy). Other tendencies include a growing interest in political violence, Christian nationalism, anti-LGBTQ rhetoric, and white identity politics. The second Trump administration's Make America Healthy Again initiative has also promoted medical pseudoscience involving opposition to vaccination, transgender healthcare misinformation, fad diets, and alternative medicine.

A paper published in The Annals of the American Academy of Political and Social Science said, "Trump undermined faith in elections, encouraged political violence, vilified the mainstream media, [and] positioned himself as a law-and-order strongman challenging immigrants and suppressing protests." These developments have resulted in a number of indices and experts ceasing to classify the country as a democracy. The Polity data series classified the United States as an "anocracy" following the attempted self-coup by Trump in the January 6 United States Capitol attack of 2021; in 2024 and 2025, it was further downgraded and, by October 2025, described as "no longer considered a democracy" and lying "at the cusp of autocracy."

Bright Line Watch made similar statements in September 2025, describing expert ratings of the country as "closer to those of a mixed or illiberal democracy than a full democracy." (Note: Bright Line Watch describes an illiberal democracy as including: executive influence on the judiciary, weak enforcement of financial laws, pressure on the media and selective access, partial manipulation of official statistics, and firing of government employees based on political criteria.)

== Jim Crow era ==
=== Lead-up to Jim Crow ===
The first Reconstruction era started with the Emancipation Proclamation in 1863. In the immediate aftermath of the American Civil War, the federal government of the United States initially took an active role in reducing racial discrimination. Between 1865 and 1870, three Reconstruction Amendments to the Constitution were passed to address racial inequality in the South: the Thirteenth (which abolished most forms of slavery), the Fourteenth (which addressed citizenship rights and equal protection under the law), and the Fifteenth (which made it illegal to deny the right to vote on the basis of "race, color, or previous condition of servitude"). With this, the number of African American men who could vote went from 0.5% in 1866 to 70% in 1872. These amendments would have offered more sweeping protections, but some Republican lawmakers wanted to limit their impact so that they would not apply to immigrants or poorer people in their districts.

By the late 1870s, however, white backlash against the social, economic, and political gains of Black people (exemplified by the violence and persecution they faced from terrorist groups like the Ku Klux Klan) contributed to the Compromise of 1877, wherein the Democratic Party (then dominated by Southern white supremacists) agreed to let Republicans win the 1876 presidential election, in exchange for removing federal troops from the South and, in the words of historian James M. McPherson, "the abandonment of the Black man to his fate." Former supporters of Reconstruction-era policies began to argue that the government had made "too many changes too fast," and a White conservative movement within the Republican Party also started to gain influence.

=== Jim Crow era ===
In November 1898, white supremacist Democrats in North Carolina orchestrated a coup in Wilmington, deploying armed paramilitary groups to burn the Daily Record newspaper office, as it was Black-owned. They also terrorised Black neighbourhoods and forced the resignation at gunpoint of the elected biracial city government, which they successfully replaced with their own appointees. In the months that followed, they entrenched their victory through a new state constitutional amendment imposing various measures, such as poll taxes and literacy tests. These disenfranchised almost all African Americans and many poor whites for nearly seventy years, ushering in a region‑wide Jim Crow order of racial segregation and white‑supremacist authoritarian rule.

The Jim Crow era saw an erosion of political and civil rights that would span decades; between the 1890s and 1910s, Southern governments passed Jim Crow laws, which instituted poll taxes, literacy tests, and other discriminatory systems, barring many Black and impoverished White Americans from voting. By 1913, this disenfranchisement extended into the federal government, as the Wilson administration introduced segregation there as well. Jim Crow policies have been described as a democratic breakdown (or backsliding).

== 21st century ==
Countries autocratizing (red) or democratizing (blue) substantially and significantly (2010–2020) according to the V-Dem Institute; the remainder are substantially unchanged.

The 21st century saw the erosion of voting rights and the rise of partisan gerrymandering by state legislatures. The first presidency of Donald Trump accelerated the undermining of democratic norms. A paper published in The Annals of the American Academy of Political and Social Science said, "Trump undermined faith in elections, encouraged political violence, vilified the mainstream media, [and] positioned himself as a law-and-order strongman challenging immigrants and suppressing protests."

In 2013, former president Jimmy Carter stated that the United States "does not at the moment have a functioning democracy" in response to the Snowden disclosures about mass surveillance in the United States.

In 2019, political scientists Robert R. Kaufman and Stephan Haggard saw "striking parallels in terms of democratic dysfunction, polarization, the nature of autocratic appeals, and the processes through which autocratic incumbents sought to exploit elected office" in the United States under Trump compared to other backsliding countries (Venezuela, Turkey, and Hungary). They argued that a transition to competitive authoritarianism is possible but unlikely. In 2020, Kurt Weyland presented a qualitative model for assessing democratic continuity and reversal using historical data from the experience of other countries. His study concluded that the United States is immune to democratic reversal. In 2021, political scientists Matias López and Juan Pablo Luna criticized his methodology and selection of parameters and argued that both democratic continuity and reversal are possible. With regard to the state of scholarly research on the subject, they wrote that "the probability of observing democratic backsliding in the United States remains an open and important question." According to some Canadian security experts, Canada may reevaluate historically close Canada–United States relations in response to democratic backsliding in the U.S., which could bring instability to the region and compromise Canada's greatest source of intelligence, and Canadian Prime Minister Mark Carney has openly said that U.S.–Canadian relations have entered a new chapter wherein the United States will no longer be seen as a trustworthy partner.

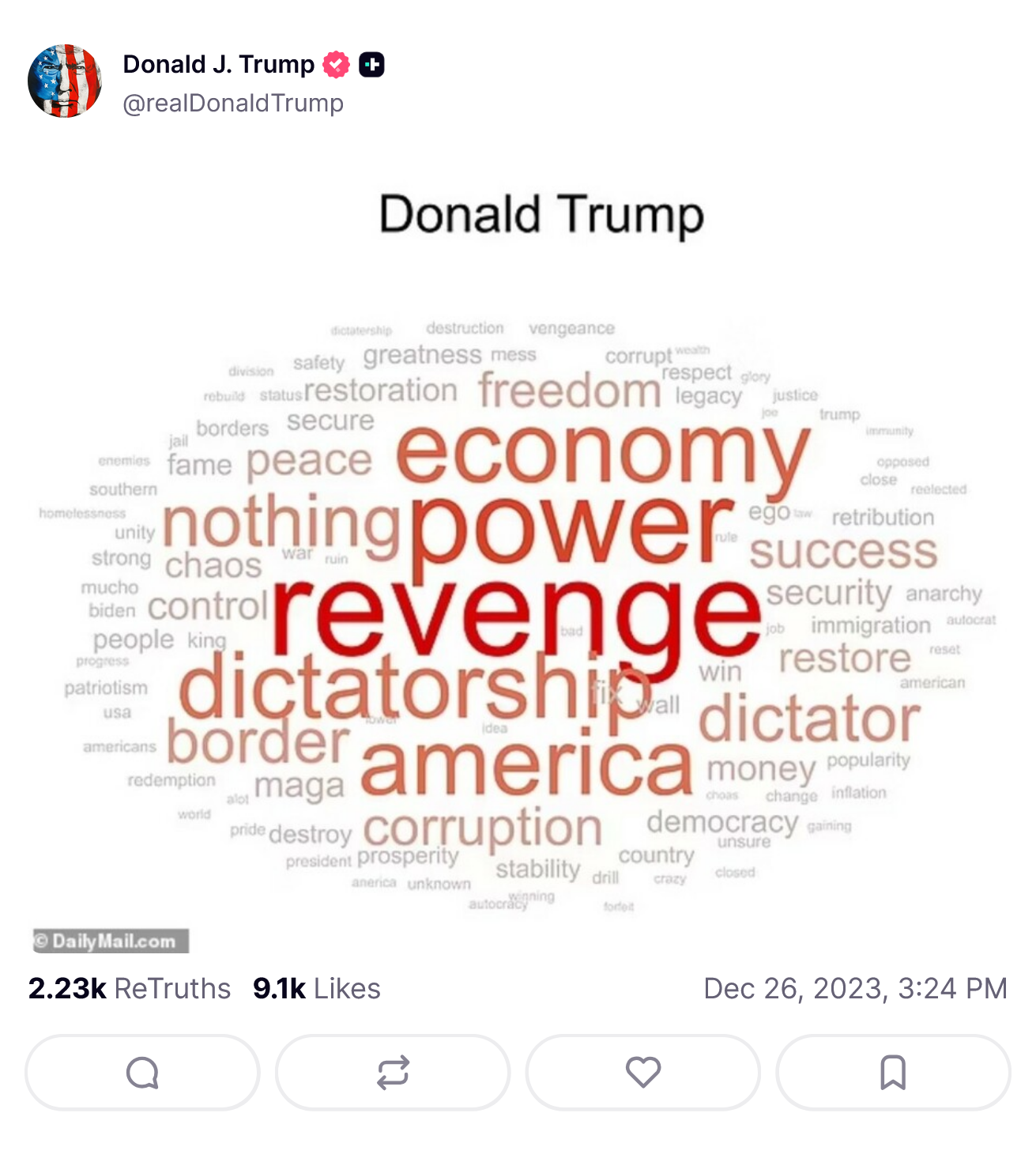
In 2023, Donald Trump posted a wordcloud to his Truth Social account summarizing a Daily Mail poll of words voters associated with him.

Quickly after resuming office for his second term in 2025, Trump became increasingly criticized by political scientists, scholars, and other significant figures for the threat he poses to American democracy. Early on, many cited the expansion of executive power and the reduction of agency workforces and regulations by the Department of Government Efficiency as an example of such threats. Freedom House described the pardon of January 6 United States Capitol attack defendants as an attempt to "excuse a violent assault on a key element of democracy." Steven Levitsky found the first two months of the second Trump administration to be the most aggressively and openly authoritarian case of democratic backsliding that he has seen, expressing particular concern about attacks on the courts. In September 2025, Ray Dalio, the founder of Bridgewater Associates, warned that the United States was heading towards 1930s-style authoritarian policies.

=== Origins ===
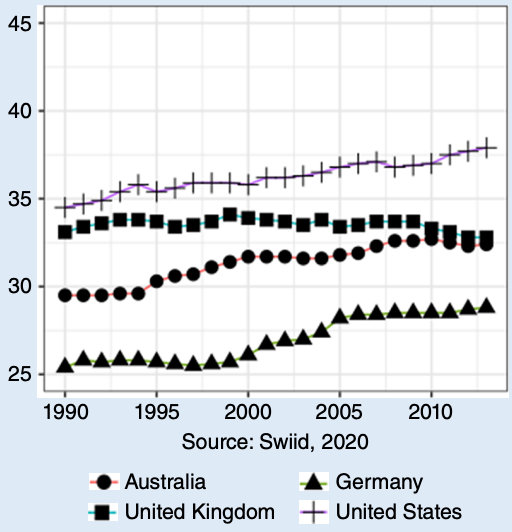
Inequality after taxes and transfers

Emma Sky and Karen J. Greenberg have linked the war on terror and the Iraq War, started during the presidency of George W. Bush, as enabling later democratic backsliding under the first Trump administration. Sky argues that the Bush administration's mismanagement of the Iraq War involving false allegations of WMDs, failure to establish a stable democracy, and tolerance of torture at Abu Ghraib led to a lack of trust in mainstream politics and a desire to seek unconventional leaders without extensive political experience such as Trump.

Although UN Sustainable Development Goals promote the existence of universal healthcare, the United States remains the only developed country without a system of universal healthcare, with 8% of its population remaining uninsured. Prices of health insurance have consistently increased, and a 2025 study found that half of Americans struggle to afford necessary healthcare. The Foundation for Research on Equal Opportunity has identified the growing costs of healthcare as a serious cause of friction and social inequality within the United States; it has argued that these cost issues invalidate claims of the American healthcare system offering more choice.

Authors such as Cass Sunstein and Maria Ressa have linked the resurgence of authoritarianism and white identity politics to the rise of far-right online forums such as 8chan and Kiwi Farms, along with social media algorithms that prioritize more sensational content. QAnon was promoted through these online forums. The changing media landscape has also resulted in a loss of accredited full-time journalists, with various authors promoting local journalism as a partial solution for political polarization.

==== War on terror ====
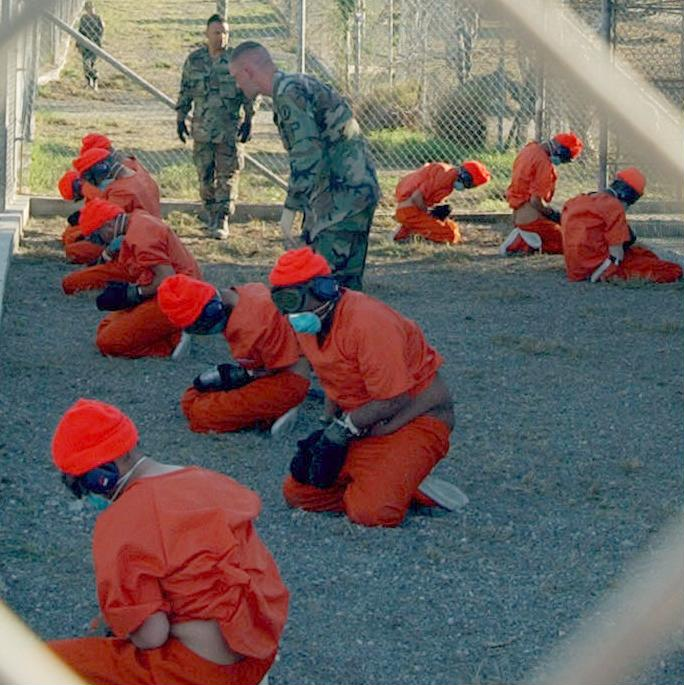
Detainees in orange jumpsuits bound in a holding area at Guantanamo Bay, 2002

Following the September 11 attacks and subsequent war on terror, democratic backsliding ensued. The war on terror is a global military campaign initiated by the United States in response to the September 11 attacks in 2001. It is a global conflict spanning multiple wars that some researchers and political scientists have argued replaced the Cold War.

In 2003, political scientists and theorists believed the third wave had crested and would soon ebb, just as the first and second waves did.

While support for the "war on terror" was high among the American public during its initial years, it had become deeply unpopular by the late 2000s. Controversy over the war has focused on its morality, casualties, and continuity, with critics questioning government measures that infringed civil liberties and human rights. Controversial practices of coalition forces have been condemned, including drone warfare, surveillance, torture, extraordinary rendition, and various war crimes. Participating governments have been criticized for implementing authoritarian measures, repressing minorities, fomenting Islamophobia globally, and damaging public health and the environment. Security analysts say the conflict has no military solution, since terrorism is not an identifiable enemy, and emphasize the importance of negotiations and political solutions to resolve the roots of the crises.

==== Inequality and the role of money in politics ====
Political scientists including Wendy Brown and H.A. Giroux argued that the United States has been de-democratizing since the 1980s because of neoconservatism and neoliberalism. Aziz Huq and Behrouz Alikhani cited the growing political influence of the wealthiest classes and global corporations, related to the loosening of campaign finance laws, especially the Citizens United Supreme Court decision that reaffirmed corporate personhood.

==== Undemocratic institutions ====
Huq also cited the inadequate democratization of national institutions since 1787. Levitsky and Ziblatt agree, finding 2016–2021 to be a period of democratic backsliding due largely to the inability to reform minoritarian institutions like the Electoral College and Senate that enabled reactionary xenophobic candidates to win office much more easily than in other democracies that had successfully reformed their institutions in the 20th century to be more representative. Tom Ginsburg and Bridgette Baldwin made similar arguments, citing the Supreme Court's role in shifting political power enough to enable authoritarianism. The Economist argues that the American constitution is more vulnerable to backsliding than parliamentary democracies, pointing to examples throughout history of backsliding in countries that copied the American model.

Levitsky and Ziblatt argue that the U.S. Constitution is the most difficult in the world to amend "by a lot" and that this helps explain why the U.S. still has so many undemocratic institutions that most or all other democracies have reformed. Ari Berman criticized Article Five of the constitution, citing how as of 2024, 7% of U.S. citizens in the 13 least populous states can block any constitutional amendment. Richard Albert says amending the U.S. Constitution is virtually impossible and that it consistently ranks among the most difficult to amend. He cites partisan division as an explanation for how it was able to be amended at certain times and not others. He argues that instead of constitutional amendments, judges, legislatures, and the executive have all taken new powers to implement changes they want to see made. He also wishes that the founders had opted for a different path during their discussions on Article V. Dan Balz and Clara Ence Morse criticized Article Five as having "proved to be virtually impossible to change" despite being designed to be updated. Jill Lepore says that amending the Constitution is a form of peaceful revolution, but when a constitution becomes so brittle and fixed, it could lead to an insurrection.

=== Redistricting and gerrymandering ===
Gerrymandering, the process of redistricting a state with unusual shapes specifically to give an advantage to one political party over another based on voter preference, has been an issue in American politics since as early as 1789 and impacting the representation of the state at the U.S. House of Representatives. Gerrymandering, whether for partisan purposes or racial discrimination, violates the U.S. Constitution, but the court systems have struggled with how to properly quantify when a constitutional violation has occurred. Because of the difficulty in enforcement, gerrymandering remained an effective tactic for political parties to control their representation in the House for over 200 years, but up through 2012, it has typically been a back-and-forth conflict between the Republicans and Democrats.

==== Partisan gerrymandering ====
After winning power in several states in 2010, the Republicans pushed for state redistricting using the results of the 2010 United States census. They implemented the Redistricting Majority Project, or REDMAP, which was aimed at redistricting states where Republicans were in control of the district maps to push for stronger Republican representation, typically through partisan gerrymandering. This was a contributing factor to the Republicans gaining control of the U.S. House by winning over 33 seats in the 2012 United States House of Representatives elections, despite losing the House popular vote.

These new Republican-drawn district maps were met by several lawsuits challenging their validity, reaching the Supreme Court across multiple cases. The Roberts Court has never struck down an election law for infringing suffrage or Equal Protection rights.

Early cases focused on partisan gerrymandering, culminating with Rucho v. Common Cause (2019), where the Court determined that while partisan gerrymandering was still illegal, determination when this occurred was too difficult to assess and ruled partisan gerrymandering cases were beyond the justiciability of the federal courts. Following the 2020 Census and Rucho, at least 18 Republican-controlled states, some that gained an extra seat from the census, made efforts to create partisan gerrymanders, at times, seeking to prevent or eliminate majority-minority districts to gain more Republican seats and flip the U.S. House in the 2022 United States House of Representatives elections. Several Democratic states with partisan redistricting committees, including New York, Illinois, and Maryland, made their own efforts to create partisan gerrymanders to offset the seats gained by Republicans in other states and maintain Democratic control of the House. The net result was that the Republicans were able to take the majority of the House, holding only a narrow, single-digit margin following the 2022 election.

==== Racial gerrymandering ====
Congress passed the Voting Rights Act of 1965 (VRA) to codify constitutional voting protections for minority voters and combat institutional racism in state voting laws, primarily for states in the southeastern United States. When the Supreme Court ruled that partisan gerrymanders could not be decided in federal courts in Rucho, new challenges to these maps arose from claims of racial gerrymandering, where Republican states often used "cracking and packing" to minimize the influence of minority voters who are more likely to vote Democratic. Chief Justice John Roberts had been keen on weakening the VRA since his nomination in 2005, saying "The way to stop discrimination on the basis of race is to stop discriminating on the basis of race." In Students for Fair Admissions v. Harvard (2023), Roberts led the court to determine affirmative action projects at colleges violated the Fourteenth Amendment, which became a precursor to other devisions to weaken the VRA.

The Supreme Court discontinued the pre-clearance regime defined by Section 5 of the VRA in Shelby County v. Holder (2013), which existed to prevent disenfranchisement by states, most in the southern US. As a whole, according to Huq, these changes shift the institutional equilibrium to "enable the replication of the system of one-party dominance akin to one that characterized the American South for much of the twentieth century."

Multiple racial gerrymandering cases were heard following the 2020 redistricting. In June 2023, the court ruled 5–4 to uphold rulings of the lower court, which used Section 2 of the VRA to instruct the state of Alabama to draw a second majority-Black congressional district, which was hailed as a win for voting rights advocates. The court ruled 6–3 that state courts can adjudicate matters related to federal elections held in their state, and the North Carolina Supreme Court was allowed to adjudicate whether the congressional map drawn by the North Carolina Legislature complied with the state constitution because the United States Constitution "does not insulate state legislatures from the ordinary exercise of state judicial review." The court rejected the independent state legislature theory, which contended that state legislatures have "effectively unchecked authority" to draw maps according to their wishes.

During his second term, Trump has openly encouraged Republican-led states to redistrict to gain more Republican seats in the House, igniting a nationwide mid-decade gerrymandering push. In August, the Texas Senate approved a new map aiming to add five Republican seats. This led Governor Gavin Newsom of California to redistrict the state in a way that would directly counter the new Texas map. In late September, Missouri Gov. Mike Kehoe signed a new map into law. The new map was challenged as being racially driven, which a three-judge panel at the district court decided was the case and had blocked the maps, but the Supreme Court ordered a stay on this in December 2025, allowing these maps to be used in 2026. During this period, the Court heard Louisiana v. Callais (2026), involving whether a second majority-minority district was required in the state due to the new census data, following Section 2 of the VRA. The Supreme Court ruled 6–3 that while the VRA was still constitutional, Section 2 could not be used to create districting maps based on race under the 14th and 15th Amendments, limiting the ability to challenge racial gerrymanders. The ruling, which many commentators said effectively ended the VRA, is expected to allow the southern states to eliminate most of the majority-minority districts and swing the states towards more likely complete Republican representation in the House.

=== Supreme Court ===
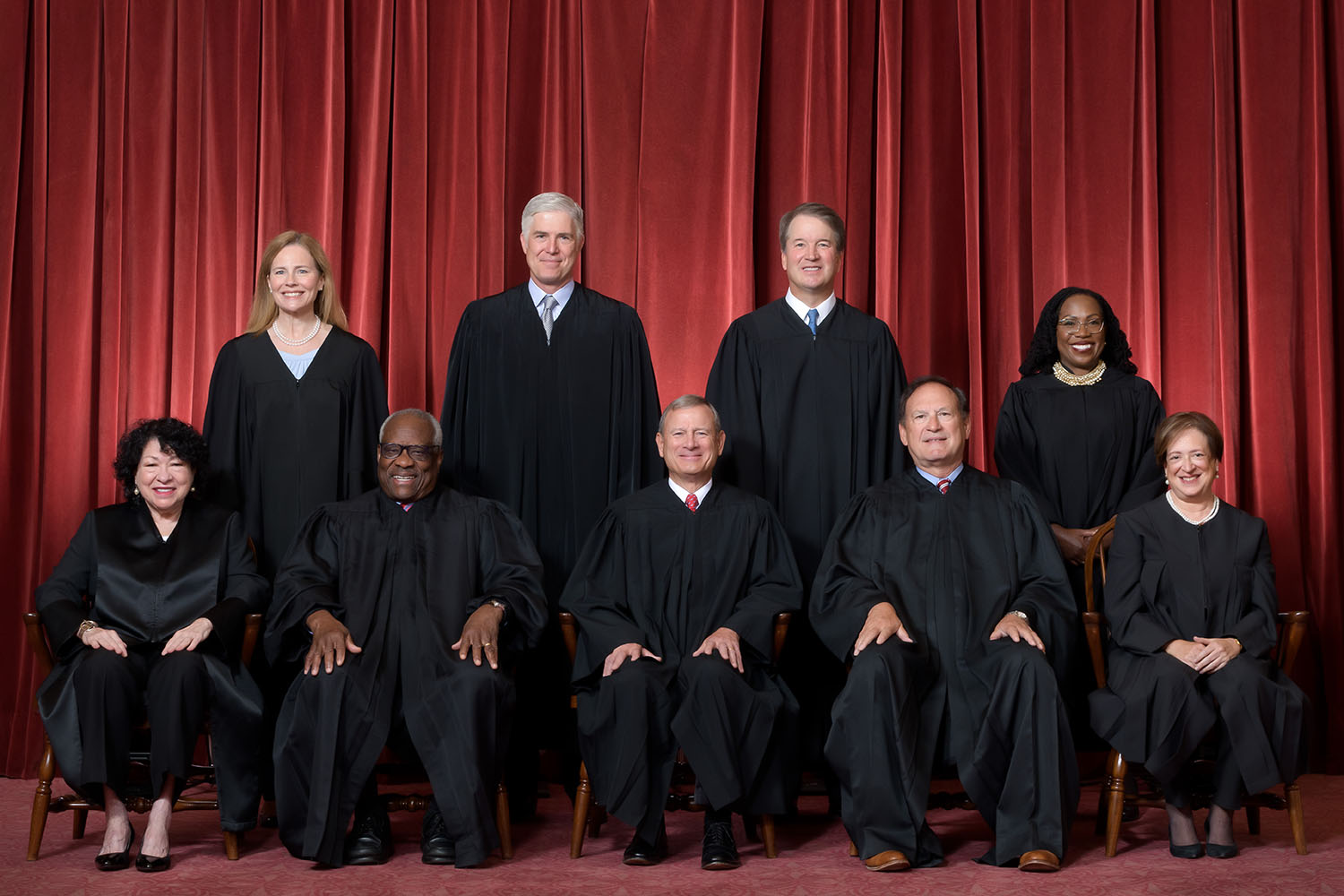
Roberts Court

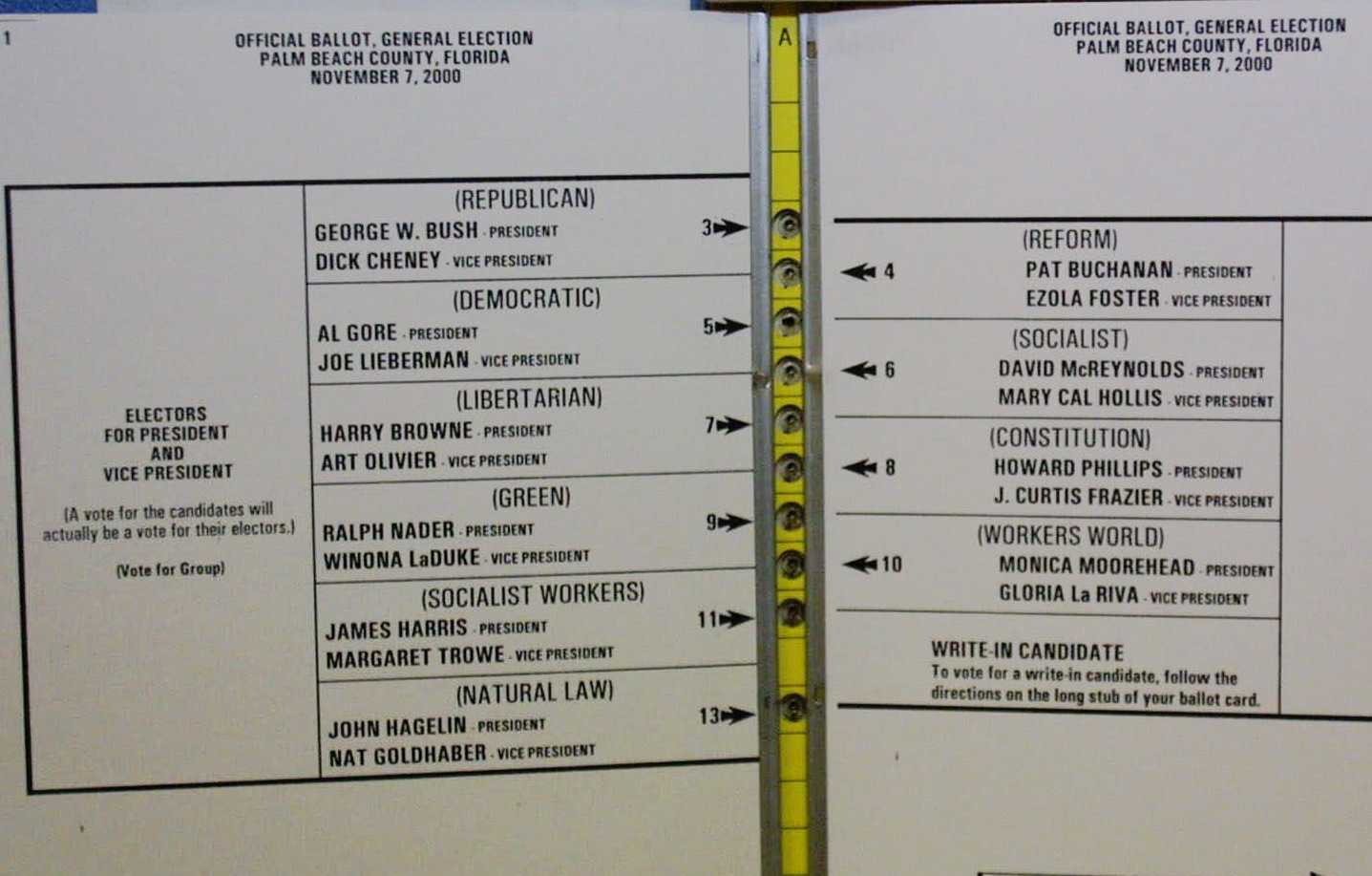
Butterfly ballot

In addition to decisions on gerrymandering, Thomas M. Keck argues that because the Court has historically not served as a strong bulwark for democracy, the Roberts Court has the opportunity to go down in history as a defender of democracy. However, he believes that if the court shields Trump from criminal prosecution (after ensuring his access to the ballot), then the risks that come with an anti-democratic status quo of the current court will outweigh the dangers that come from court reform (including court packing). Aziz Z. Huq points to the blocking progress of democratizing institutions, increasing the disparity in wealth and power, and empowering an authoritarian white nationalist movement as evidence that the Supreme Court has created a "permanent minority" incapable of democratic defeat.

In a 2024 Vox article, Ian Millhiser describes the court as having become a partisan institution, giving itself more and more power to decide political questions. He worries that the court, especially if it adds more Republican appointees, could permanently entrench Republican rule.

The Supreme Court has increased its power over the bureaucracy through the major questions doctrine and overruling the Chevron doctrine as well as over lower courts with Trump v. CASA and its expanded use of the shadow docket. The Supreme Court under Roberts has also made a number of decisions that support the unitary executive theory, that the President has sole power over the executive branch, allowing Trump to fire commissioners on several independent agencies.

=== Election subversion ===
By 2020, most state legislatures were controlled by the Republican Party, though some of those states had Democratic governors. As part of attempts to overturn the 2020 United States presidential election, many Republican legislators in seven battleground states won by Joe Biden created fraudulent certificates of ascertainment composed of "alternate electors" to declare Donald Trump had actually won their states, thereby overruling the will of voters. They hoped to pass these fraudulent certificates to vice president Mike Pence on January 6, 2021, so he would reverse Biden's election and certify Trump as the winner, a scheme which became known as the Pence Card. Pence instead counted the authentic slates of electors and properly declared Biden the victor. By June 2022, participants in the alternate electors scheme began receiving subpoenas from the House Select Committee to Investigate the January 6 Attack and the United States Department of Justice. Investigations into a Trump fake electors plot ensued.

=== Restrictions on voting ===
Despite extensive research over decades finding that voting fraud is extremely rare, many Republicans assert it is widespread and that actions must be taken to prevent it. Amid persistent false allegations that widespread fraud had led to Trump's 2020 election loss, Republicans in multiple states began taking actions in 2021 to gain control of state and county election apparatuses, limit ballot access, and challenge votes. By June, Republicans had introduced at least 216 bills in 41 states to give legislatures more power over elections officials. Republican lawmakers had stripped authority from secretaries of state, who oversee state elections. In Georgia, Republicans removed Black Democrats from county election boards. In Arkansas, they stripped election control from county authorities.

Wisconsin Republicans, led by senator Ron Johnson, sought to dismantle the bipartisan Wisconsin Elections Commission, which the party had created five years earlier. In Michigan and other swing states, Republicans sought to create an "army" of poll workers and attorneys who could refer what they deemed questionable ballots to a network of friendly district attorneys to challenge. Through May 2022, Republican voters had nominated at least 108 candidates, in some 170 midterm races, who had repeated Trump's stolen election claims; at least 149 had campaigned on tightening voting procedures, despite the lack of evidence of widespread fraud. Dozens of these nominees sought offices to oversee the administration and certification of elections.

The Safeguard American Voter Eligibility (SAVE) Act was first introduced into Congress by Republicans in July 2024. Among its provisions would be requiring that a voter demonstrate proof of American citizenship prior to federal elections, based on claims of non-citizen voting fraud in recent elections which studies demonstrate to be rare. Such identification can be through a U.S. passport, a Real ID state driver's license that indicates citizenship, or other federal identification. Democratic politicians and voting rights groups like the Brennan Center for Justice argue these requirements create difficulty for people who have moved across state lines or changed their last names through marriage, as obtaining a birth certificate or other documentation is not always easy. This makes it easier to deny voting rights to these individuals. Republican politicians and groups like the National Center for Public Policy Research argue the Act is necessary to advance election integrity and advances voter ID policies that are supported by most Americans.

While the first SAVE Act expired with the end of the 2024 congressional session, it was reintroduced in 2025 and passed the House of Representatives along party lines in April 2025; due to the limited majority that the Republicans hold in the Senate, the bill is not expected to pass there unless the Senate votes to eliminate the filibuster rule.

== Antidemocratic, authoritarian and autocratic tendencies ==
Beginning in October 2025, The New York Times editorial board published an Autocracy Index showing erosion of US democracy using various benchmarks, offering "a way to understand how much Mr. Trump is eroding American democracy" since his January 2025 inauguration.

Steven Levitsky and Daniel Ziblatt, in their 2018 book How Democracies Die, analyze major modern presidential candidates against four key indicators of authoritarian behavior and found that Richard Nixon met one, George Wallace one, and Donald Trump all four. The four indicators the authors use are 1) rejection of (or weak commitment to) democratic rules of the game, 2) denial of the legitimacy of political opponents, 3) toleration or encouragement of violence, and 4) readiness to curtail civil liberties of opponents (including the media). In their 2023 book Tyranny of the Minority, Levitsky and Ziblatt argue that the decision by partisans when faced with an authoritarian faction on whether to stay loyal to democracy by breaking with that faction has determined the fate of a number of democracies. They cite the Republican Accountability Project, which in 2021 estimated that 6% of national Republican politicians consistently stood up for democracy, with many of those who did losing reelection or retiring.

By 2021, polling and research indicated a significant shift against democracy among Republican voters, both in terms of rhetoric and acceptance of potential political violence. The shift was most pronounced among Republicans who trusted Fox News, and more so Newsmax and One America News (OAN), who were more inclined to believe the disproven assertion that the 2020 presidential election had been stolen from Trump. A November 2021 Public Religion Research Institute (PRRI) poll found that two-thirds of Republicans believed the election had been stolen, as did 82 percent of those who trusted Fox News more than any other media outlet. Ninety-seven percent of those who trusted Newsmax and OAN believed the election was stolen. Thirty percent of Republicans agreed with the statement "True American patriots may have to resort to violence in order to save our country," rising to 40 percent among those who trust Newsmax and OAN; eleven percent of Democrats agreed. Robert Jones, CEO of PRRI, said he was deeply concerned about the poll findings, and "we really have to take them seriously as a threat to democracy." Political scientist John Pitney, who was previously a domestic policy and legislative aide for congressional Republicans, remarked, "Back in the 1980s, Republicans aspired to be the party of hope and opportunity. Now it is the party of blood and soil. The culture war is front and center, and for many Republicans, it is close to being a literal war, not just a metaphorical one." Political scientist Larry Bartels, a co-director of the Center for the Study of Democratic Institutions at Vanderbilt University, wrote in August 2020 that "substantial numbers of Republicans endorse statements contemplating violations of key democratic norms, including respect for the law and for the outcomes of elections and eschewing the use of force in pursuit of political ends." He ascribed the primary cause to "ethnic antagonism" among Republicans toward immigrants and minorities seeking political power and claims on government resources.

A survey between 2017 and 2019 found a third of Americans want a "strong leader who doesn't have to bother with Congress or elections," and one-quarter had a favorable view of military rule. A research study administered in 2019 found that Trump supporters were more likely to condone executive aggrandizement, while Republicans were more likely to support a candidate who suspends Congress or ignores court verdicts. The January 6 Capitol attack has been described as an example of de-democratization and democratic backsliding. It has also been described as a coup d'état or self-coup. Zack Beauchamp described Donald Trump's 2024 presidential campaign as another step on the road of democratic backsliding, wondering whether American democracy could survive a second Trump presidency.

In March 2025, ICE detained Mahmoud Khalil without charging him with any crime and reportedly threatened his wife with arrest. Donna Lieberman, director of the New York Civil Liberties Union, condemned the detention and said it is a "targeted, retaliatory, and an extreme attack on his First Amendment rights" and "reeks of McCarthyism." Later that same month, the administration revoked the student visa of Ranjani Srinivasan, one of several Columbia University students targeted by immigration officials.

=== Religious and white nationalism ===
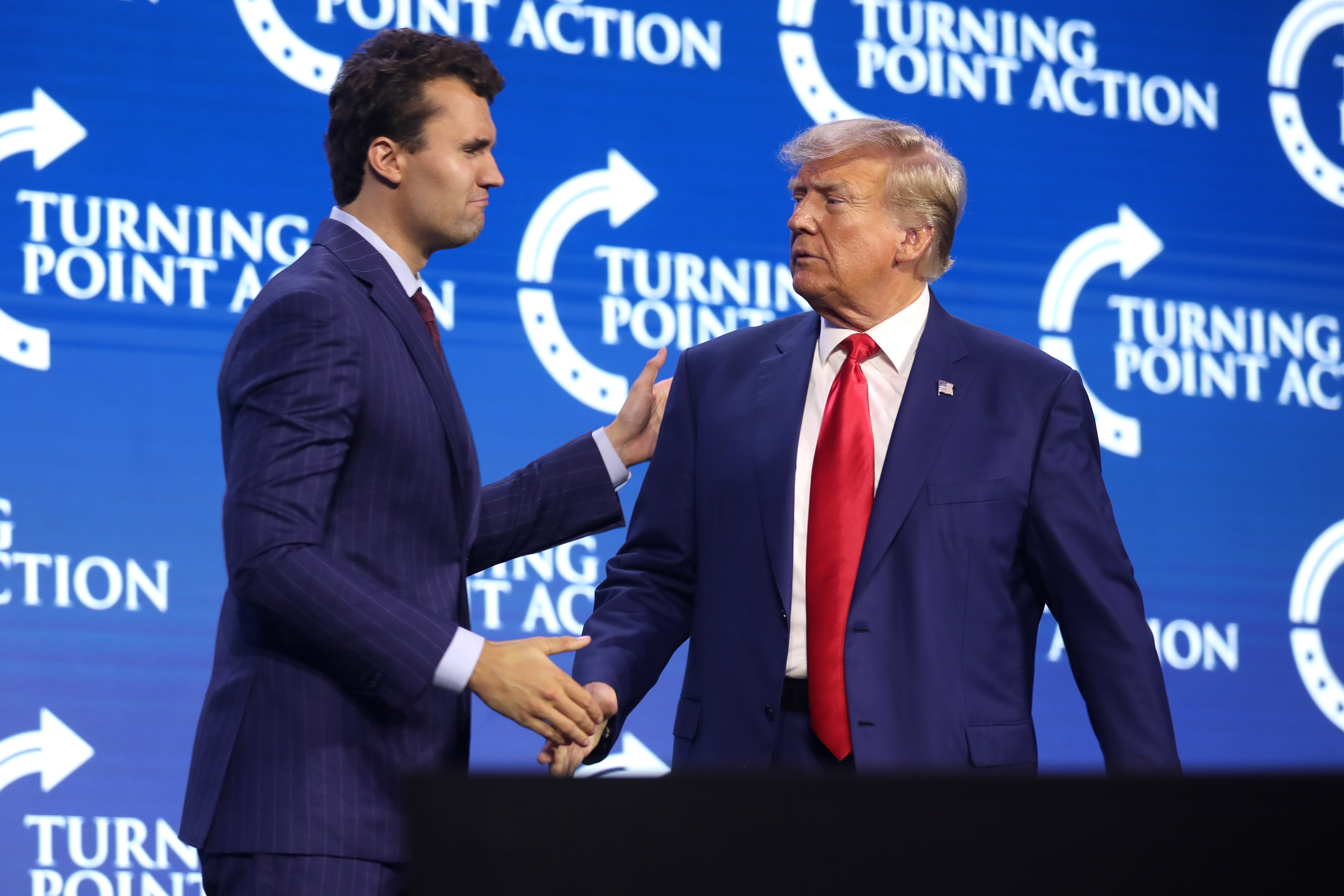
Charlie Kirk and Donald Trump at a Turning Point Action conference in 2023

During the Trump era, a far-right, populist movement based on Christian nationalism surged, gaining a significant degree of mainstream acceptance, typified by the once fringe New Apostolic Reformation. The ideology of Trumpism broadly adheres to a deeply held belief that America was founded as a Christian nation. Philip Gorski, a Yale professor of the sociology of religion, calls this "a mythological version of American history." Movement adherents believe their Christian dominance has been usurped by other races and faiths, which Gorski characterizes as a form of racial tribalism: "a 'we don't like people who are trying to change [our country] or people who are different' form of nationalism." Multiple studies have found that support for democracy among white Americans is negatively correlated with their level of racial prejudice, resentment, and desire to maintain white power and status.

Researchers have observed that many in the movement seek to reduce or eliminate the separation of church and state found in the Constitution. Some Christian nationalists also believe Trump was divinely chosen to save white Christian America. In their 2022 book, The Flag and the Cross: White Christian Nationalism and the Threat to American Democracy, Gorski and co-author Samuel Perry, a professor of sociology at the University of Oklahoma, wrote that white Christian nationalists share a set of common anti-democratic beliefs and principles that "add up to a political vision that privileges the tribe. And they seek to put other tribes in their proper place." Some believe in a "Warrior Christ" they will follow with the use of righteous violence.

A protester holding a sign denouncing Christian nationalism during the 50501 protests in February 2025

During a September 2020 presidential debate, Trump was asked if he would condemn white supremacists and militia groups that had appeared at some protests that year. After his opponent Joe Biden mentioned Proud Boys, Trump stated, "Proud Boys, stand back and stand by," adding, "Somebody's got to do something about Antifa and the left because this is not a right-wing problem." After Trump and his allies exhausted legal avenues to overturn the results of the 2020 presidential election, several leaders of Proud Boys and Oath Keepers were indicted and convicted on federal seditious conspiracy charges for their roles in the January 6 United States Capitol attack as Congress assembled to certify Biden's election. The Department of Homeland Security (DHS) stated in October 2020 that white supremacists posed the top domestic terrorism threat, which FBI director Christopher Wray confirmed in March 2021, noting that the bureau had elevated the threat to the same level as ISIS. The release of the DHS findings had been delayed for months, which a whistleblower, the department's acting intelligence chief Brian Murphy, attributed to reluctance of DHS leaders to release information that would reflect poorly on the president in an election year.

Every Republican voted against a July 2022 House measure requiring Homeland Security, the FBI, and the Defense Department to "publish a report that analyzes and sets out strategies to combat white supremacist and neo-Nazi activity" in their ranks. A 2019 survey of active service members found that about one third had "personally witnessed examples of white nationalism or ideological-driven racism within the ranks in recent months." About one-fifth of those who were charged for participating in the January 6 attack were veterans, with some on active service.

Rachel Kleinfeld, a scholar of global political violence and democracy at the Carnegie Endowment for International Peace, found in July 2022 that Trump's affinity for far-right militia groups dated to his 2016 campaign and such groups had since become increasingly mainstream in the Republican Party. She argued the militia influence had spread since the January 6 attack among Republican leaders at the national, state, and local levels. Political scientist Barbara Walter, who has studied political violence leading to civil war, commented in March 2022 that "There are definitely lots of groups on the far right who want war. They are preparing for war ... We know the warning signs. And we know that if we strengthen our democracy, and if the Republican Party decides it's no longer going to be an ethnic faction that's trying to exclude everybody else, then our risk of civil war will disappear."

=== Reactions ===
In March 2025, historian Christopher R. Browning found "considerable" democratic backsliding. Adrienne LaFrance wrote in April 2025 that "backsliding" may not be a strong enough word given the speed with which she believes U.S. democracy is declining under the second Trump administration. National security researcher Tom Nichols argued in October 2025 that Trump has taken control of the country's intelligence and judicial systems and is now testing the independence of the military.

In September 2023, thirteen presidential centers dating from Herbert Hoover to Barack Obama released an unprecedented joint message warning of the fragile state of American democracy. The statement called for a recommitment to the rule of law and civility in political discourse, as well as respect for democratic institutions and secure and accessible elections.

President Joe Biden warned of threats to democracy during addresses in 2022 and 2023. At a fundraiser in August 2022, Biden said Donald Trump's MAGA philosophy was "like semi-fascism." In September 2023, weeks after Trump had been indicted on federal and state charges related to his attempts to overturn the 2020 United States presidential election, and as most Republicans still refused to accept Trump's 2020 election loss, Biden said:

There's something dangerous happening in America now. There's an extremist movement that does not share the basic beliefs of our democracy: The MAGA movement. There's no question that today's Republican Party is driven and intimidated by MAGA Republican extremists. Their extreme agenda, if carried out, would fundamentally alter the institutions of American democracy as we know it.

Hillary Clinton, whom Trump defeated in 2016, said in October 2023 that Trump was likely to be the 2024 Republican presidential nominee and if elected "will wreck our democracy", likening his MAGA supporters to a "cult".

=== Congress ===
Despite the importance of Congress outlined in Article One, Congress has lost power to the executive and judiciary both intentionally and unintentionally.

=== Executive ===
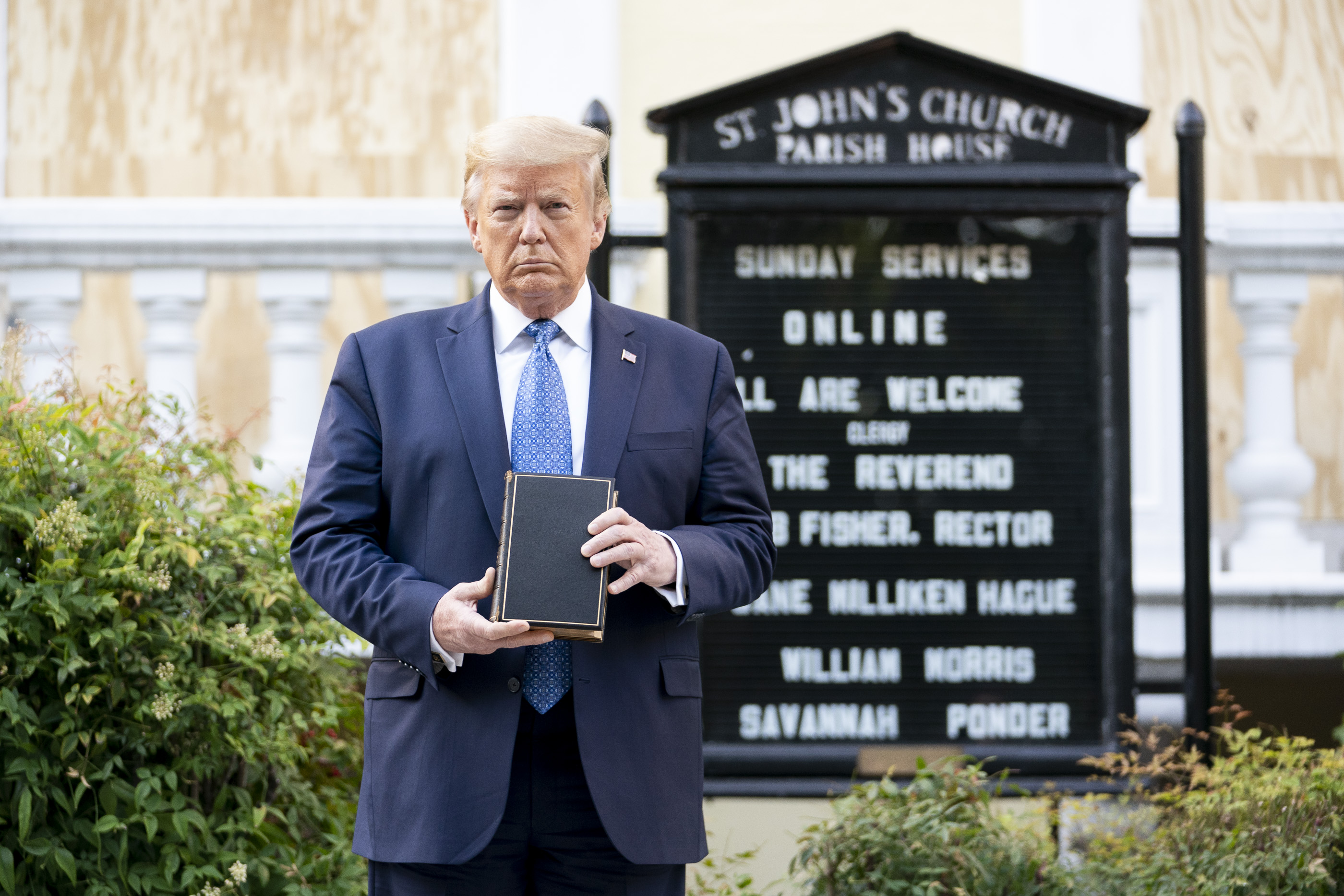
Donald Trump photo op at St. John's Church

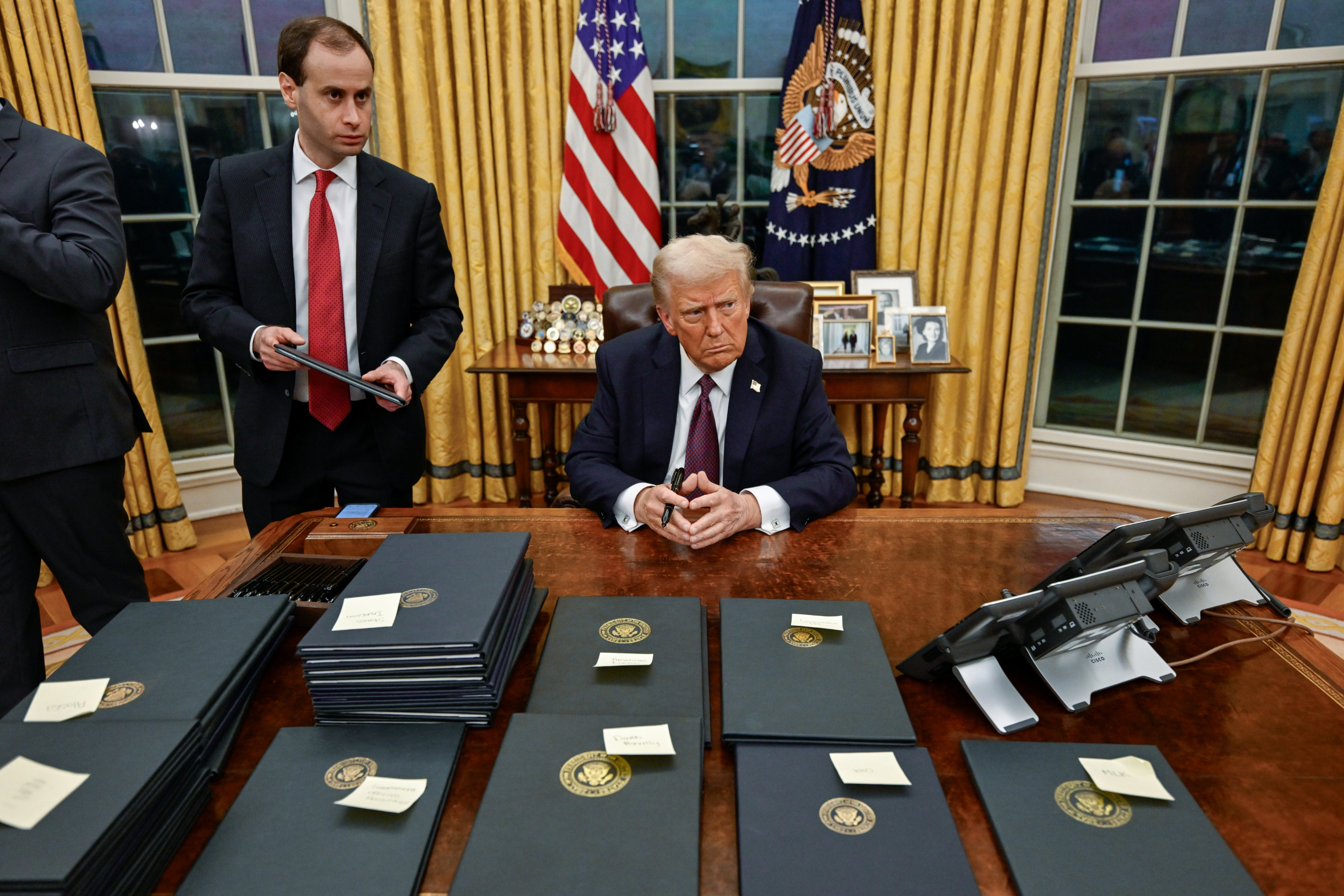
Trump surrounded by stacks of executive orders

If you take power, and exert it, the system is not so tough. You know why? They're all gutless cowards. The university administrators? They're not so tough. The big law firms? They are not so tough. The media? Look who's greater, how many times have they settled with Trump? They're not tough. We're (...) tough. The people around Trump are battle-hardened. Okay? You're not going to scare us. And we're not gonna stop.

— Steve Bannon in 2025

==== Law ====
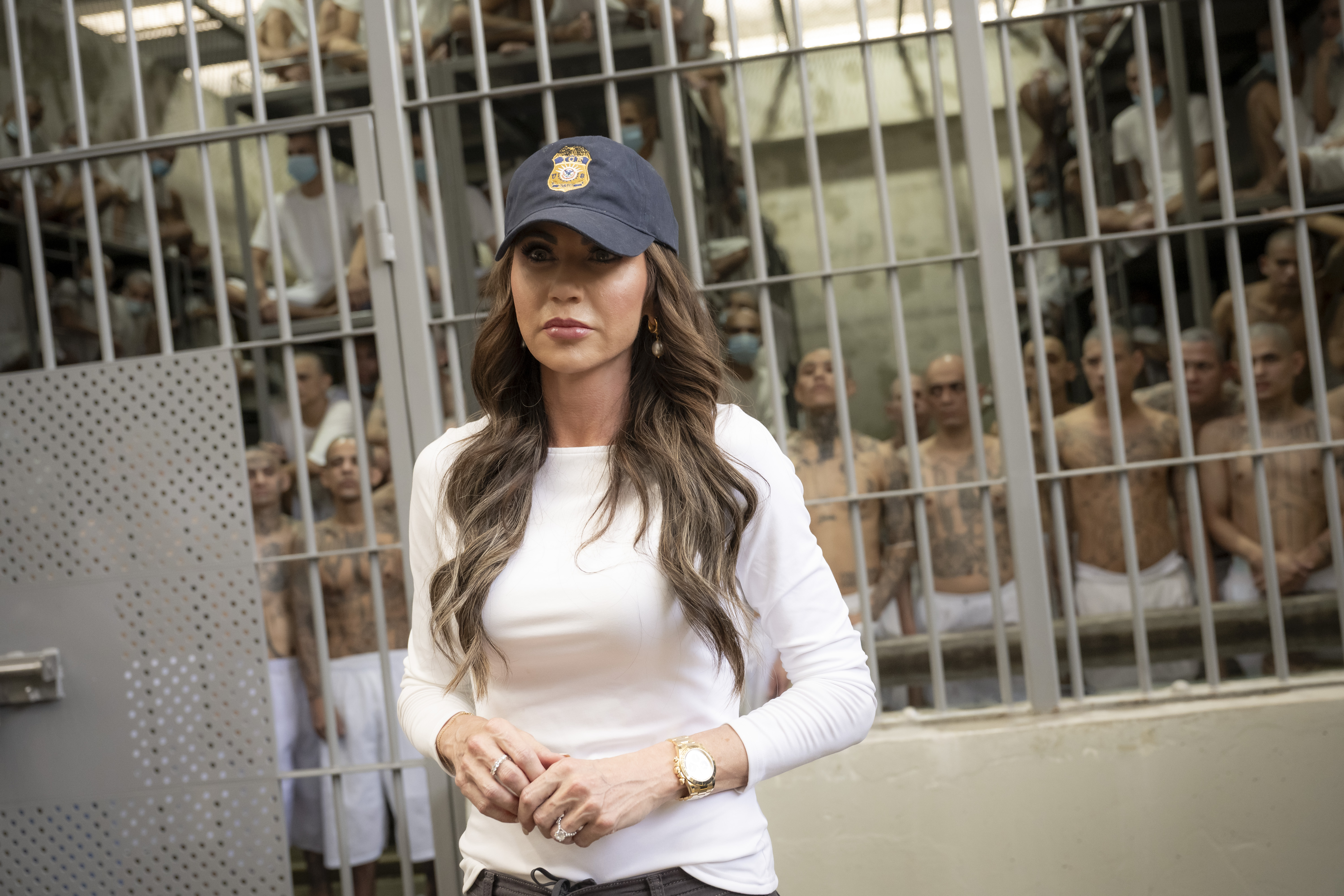
Secretary of Homeland Security Kristi Noem, during a March 2025 tour of CECOT, the Salvadoran prison which holds extrajudicial prisoners

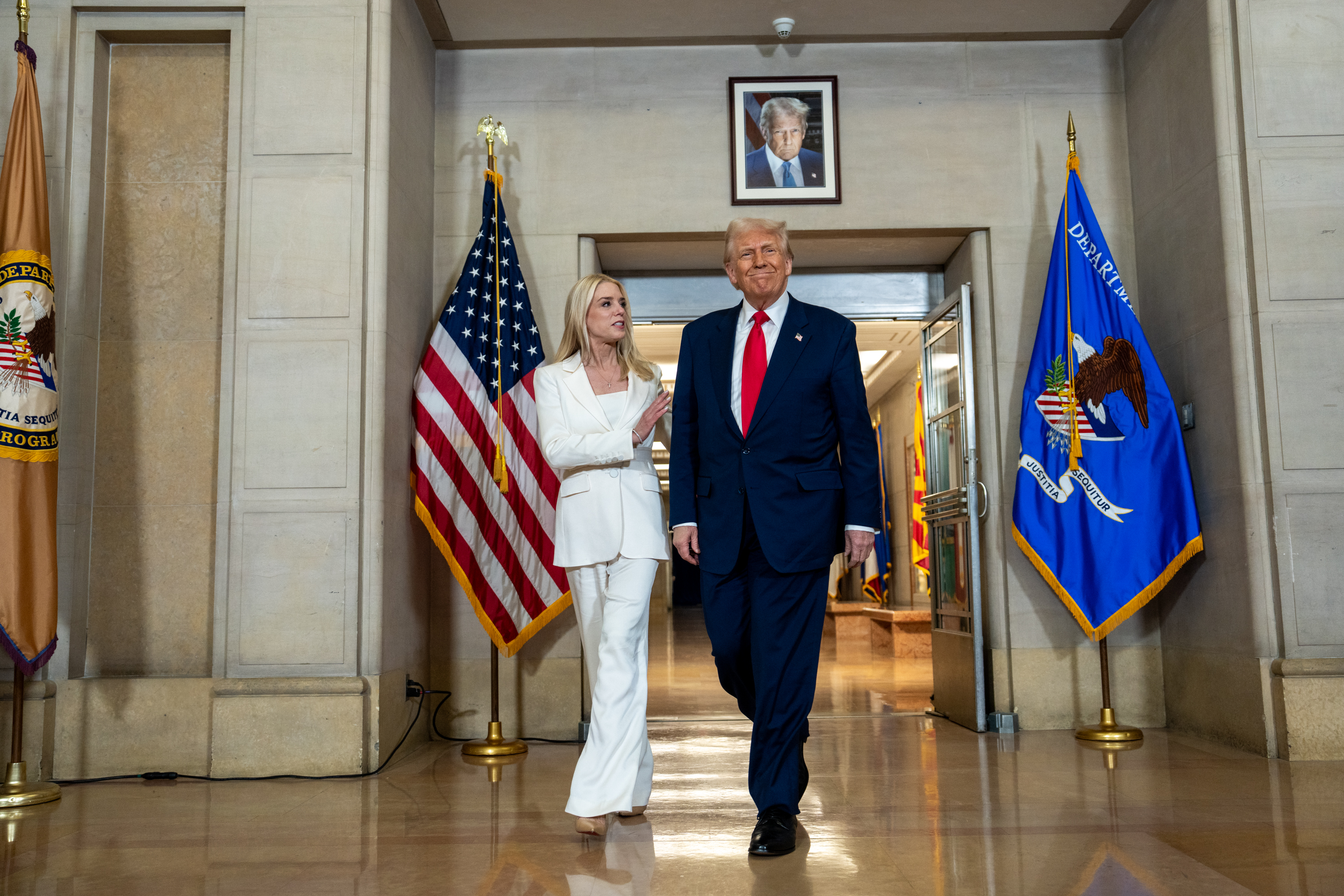
President Trump touring the Department of Justice headquarters with Pam Bondi, the Attorney General, previously one of Trump's defense lawyers

Trump in December 2025: "As it turned out, we didn't need legislation, we just needed a new president."

During the first year of his second presidency, Trump appointed personal lawyers and loyalists to positions including Pam Bondi, Emil Bove, Todd Blanche, Stanley Woodward, and D. John Sauer.

In February 2026, Patrick J. Schiltz wrote, "The court is not aware of another occasion in the history of the United States in which a federal court has had to threaten contempt—again and again and again—to force the United States government to comply with court orders."

==== Unitary executive theory and Project 2025 ====
The unitary executive theory has for most of its existence been a fringe legal theory in conservative circles that arose after Watergate. It has been cited as justification for many of the increases in presidential power starting with the Reagan administration and has been used by Presidents of both parties tend to view the idea that they should have increased power more favorably when in office and been taken most seriously by the Roberts Court. The concentration of power the theory advocates for is typically seen only in democracies on the path towards autocracy and has raised alarms around democratic backsliding. Project 2025 proposed a framework for expanding presidential power during the second Trump administration based on a maximalist version of the unitary executive theory.

In April 2023, the Heritage Foundation, a conservative think tank, unveiled Project 2025, a political initiative that details comprehensive plans for the next Republican president to consolidate control over the executive branch. Over 100 conservative organizations contributed to the project. Project 2025 proposes sweeping changes in the federal government relating to social and economic issues by cutting funding for, dismantling, or abolishing altogether major Cabinet departments and agencies, with the objective of placing their functions under the full and direct control of the president to impose an array of conservative policies on a national scale. The proposal includes replacing thousands of career federal civil servants with Trump loyalists to implement the plan and includes the deployment of military forces for domestic law enforcement, pursuing Trump's political adversaries, and infusing government policies with Christian beliefs.

Several experts in law have indicated that Project 2025 would undermine the rule of law and the separation of powers. Ruth Ben-Ghiat, a scholar of fascism and authoritarian leaders at New York University, wrote in May 2024 that Project 2025 "is a plan for an authoritarian takeover of the United States that goes by a deceptively neutral name," characterizing participants in the project as "American incarnations of fascism." Announcing in June 2024 the formation of a task force to address Project 2025, Democratic congressman Jared Huffman characterized it as "an unprecedented embrace of extremism, fascism, and religious nationalism, orchestrated by the radical right and its dark money backers." Some academics worry Project 2025 represents significant executive aggrandizement, a type of democratic backsliding.

=== Militarism ===
During his second presidency, Donald Trump ordered deployments of National Guard troops to select U.S. cities in 2025 and certain deployments have continued into 2026. Trump has given multiple explanations for the deployments, saying they are officially part of crackdowns on protests, civil unrest, crime, homelessness, and illegal immigration. The actions targeted Democratic Party-led cities and sparked significant controversy, with critics labeling them as abuses of power and potential violations of laws like the Posse Comitatus Act, which limits military involvement in domestic law enforcement. The moves came amidst broader expansions of the military's domestic use during the second Trump administration, and Trump's prior comments during his presidential campaign to use the military to end civil unrest and protests without consent from state governors and target "the enemy within".

Deployments began in Los Angeles in June 2025 and expanded to Washington, D.C., in August 2025, before presidential authorizations were issued to expand to Memphis, Tennessee, and Portland, Oregon, in September 2025. Federal forces arrived in Memphis in October 2025. Plans were underway for Chicago and potentially other cities like New York, Baltimore, San Francisco, and Oakland, California. In September 2025, Trump told military leaders to view the deployments as "training grounds for our military" and described America as under "invasion" and waging "a war from within". In October 2025, Trump authorized federal troop deployments in Chicago as part of Operation Midway Blitz, a multi-agency surge aimed at "criminal illegal aliens" in Illinois and moved on to New Orleans in December.

On September 2, 2025, a federal judge ruled that the administration had illegally sent troops into Los Angeles in violation of the Posse Comitatus Act, a development described as potentially complicating Trump's threats for further military deployment. Further court cases and appeals questioned the legality of the deployments, with the U.S. Supreme Court rejecting an administration emergency appeal of a lower court ruling blocking the National Guard deployment to Chicago. On December 31, Trump announced that the administration would be ending its efforts to deploy the National Guard to Los Angeles, Portland, and Chicago, while suggesting that future National Guard deployments in those cities were still possible. In January 2026, all troops deployed to Chicago, Portland, and Los Angeles were withdrawn, while the National Guard deployment to the District of Columbia was extended to the end of the year.

== Indicators ==
=== Bright Line Watch ===
Bright Line Watch October 2026 survey of experts classified the United States at 61, still well below democratic peers of Great Britain (83) and Canada (88). It polls political scientists more regularly than some other indices and has shown a significant decrease in democracy at the start of Trump's first and second terms.

Brendan Nyhan and NPR interpreted 2025 survey results as showing significant consensus among political scientists around concerns for further democratic backsliding at the start of the second Trump administration. While not a representative sample, it is a large sample that has been used since 2016 to gauge shifts in how experts and the public perceive American democracy's health.

=== Freedom House ===
As part of their Freedom in the World survey series, Freedom House downgraded the United States' score significantly in their civil rights and political liberties index between 2010 (94) and 2020 (83), including an accelerated 6-point loss during the first presidency of Donald Trump alone, citing the need for three main reforms: removing barriers to voting, limiting the influence of money in politics, and establishing independent redistricting commissions.

In the Freedom in the World index published in 2026, the U.S. received its lowest score (81) since the report began its 100-point system in 2002.

=== Polity ===
The Polity data series labels the United States an anocracy. In 2025, they wrote: "The USA is no longer considered a democracy and lies at the cusp of autocracy; it has experienced a Presidential Coup and an Adverse Regime Change event."

=== IDEA ===
International IDEA labeled the U.S. a "backsliding democracy" after evaluating 2020 and 2021 events, including January 6 and a poorly functioning legislature. IDEA's democracy scores started sliding for the United States in 2016.

In their democracy index published in 2025, which was conducted before Trump's second term, the U.S. was among the lowest-ranking OECD members in all categories except for participation. Secretary General of the IDEA, Kevin Casas Zamora, said, "Some of the things that we saw during the [2024] election at the end of last year and in the first few months of 2025 are fairly disturbing".

In IDEA's most recent report published in 2026, democratic backsliding in the U.S. was particularly highlighted, with "key indicators of democracy in the US [having] fallen to their lowest levels in 50 years". According to the report, President Trump amassed executive power in 2025, leading to "far-reaching [consequences], undermining the rule of law domestically and internationally and testing long-standing alliances and multilateral cooperation." That year, the organization also added the U.S. to its list of "backsliding democracies" for the first time since 2021.

IDEA's Head of Democracy Assessment Unit, Seema Shah, said in 2026 that the United States' historical role as "a bastion of democratic governance, with strong performance in the rule of law and judicial independence and a prominent role in promoting democracy around the world" was "no longer the case", with "the U.S. administration [...] actually providing fodder for other non-democratic leaders."

=== State Democracy Index ===
Jacob Grumbach published the State Democracy Index, which evaluates states between 2000 and 2018 on the strength of their electoral democracy. While starting in 2002 and accelerating after the 2010 elections and redistricting, Grumbach found that almost all democratic backsliding in American states occurred under unified Republican Party control, while Democratic Party-controlled and divided states have become more democratic. Grumbach found Alabama, Tennessee, Ohio, Wisconsin, and North Carolina were the worst performers (with Wisconsin and North Carolina previously ranking at the top) and suggested a sense of racial threat was one of the main drivers in these states with larger Black populations becoming more anti-democratic. Grumbach also cites economic inequality, the nationalization of state politics through declining journalism, and an increase in national donors as contributors of backsliding. While he notes it would be difficult to compare across eras, he believes that the slavery and Jim Crow eras in particular had far greater gaps in the quality of democracy between states than the present-day gaps he analyzes and notes that the U.S., in the eyes of some, was not a democracy until 1964. Vox describes this index as the first attempt to quantify democracy between U.S. states and as being widely praised. 2018–2024 resulted in slight improvements overall thanks to the expansion of mail-in voting during COVID-19 and a couple states restricting gerrymandering.

=== The Economist Democracy Index ===
The Economist Democracy Index started the U.S. at the index's launch in 2006 at an 8.22/10 (full democracy), though the rating started declining in 2010, with the country being classified as a flawed democracy beginning in 2016. It dropped to its lowest rating yet of 7.65 in 2025. The Economist stated that since Donald Trump's second presidency, "[e]fforts to redraw electoral boundaries, the use of the military to quell protests and continued political polarisation weighed on America's score. The Department of Government Efficiency disrupted the functioning of government, and attempts to muzzle the media hit civil liberties."

=== V-Dem ===
In the V-Dem Institute's democracy report published in 2026, which describes the year 2025, the U.S. was classified as an "electoral democracy" for the first time in over 50 years, losing its status as a liberal democracy. The V-Dem Democracy Indices showed significant declines from 2016 to 2020.

In March 2025, V-Dem Institute's director, Staffan I. Lindberg said the U.S. was on track to lose its democracy status in six months. In September 2025, he said this had occurred by his analysis. V-Dem has measures on democracy starting in 1789, providing rare historical data to compare backsliding events, though comparing across centuries has challenges.

V-Dem also scores political parties in an annual illiberalism score and ranked the Republican Party more similar to authoritarian parties than typical center-right governing parties.

=== The Century Foundation ===
The Century Foundation's Democracy Meter for 2025 rated the U.S. at 57/100 on its scale involving 23 categories to evaluate the quality of democracy, down from 79/100 in 2024. Their "analysis suggests U.S. democracy is at greater risk than at any time since Watergate, and it may even be approaching its pre-Civil Rights Movement lowpoint."

They summarized the situation as "In the first year of Trump 2.0, the United States went from being a passing if imperfect democracy to behaving like an authoritarian state: breaking the law, ignoring court rulings, engaging in grand corruption, targeting critics for persecution, and conducting a campaign against immigrants [...] that flagrantly violates civil rights. Crucially, elections are still free, providing for the time being an avenue to reverse the democratic decline."

=== Authoritarian Threat Index ===
Since 2025, Protect Democracy's Authoritarian Threat Index rates the U.S. at 3.4 on a scale ranging from 1 ("Low Threat") to 5 ("Catastrophic Threat"), indicating a "Severe Threat" to U.S. democracy in all categories measured. In September 2025, the U.S. scored 55/100 on said index's overall threat level score, the highest ever recorded.

=== Inter American Press Association ===
In the Inter American Press Association's press freedom index report published in 2026, which measured the period between November 2024 and November 2025, the U.S. saw the sharpest drop in press freedom in the Americas and fell from a country categorized as "Low Restrictions" to "With Restrictions." The country was singled out in the report as an area of "alarming decline," with changes under President Donald Trump cited as a primary factor. According to the report, Trump's actions contributed to the "stigmatisation of critical journalism."

=== World Press Freedom Index ===
The 2026 World Press Freedom Index report published by Reporters Without Borders saw the U.S. drop from 57th place in 2025 to 64th "due to growing political pressure."

In the "Political context" section of the U.S. country profile, the organization stated, "Since returning to the White House in 2025, President Trump has extended the war on the press he launched while running for his first presidential term. He has censored government data, attempted to dismantle US public broadcasters, weaponized independent government agencies to punish media that criticize his actions, halted aid funding for media freedom internationally, sued disfavored outlets, and applied pressure to install cronies to lead others. Press freedom in the United States continues to decline as a result of these actions."

=== Financial Times ===
According to a 30-point index by the Financial Times based on 10 domains measuring democratic qualities published in 2026, democratic backsliding in the U.S. in the first year of Trump's second term has been steeper than in Hungary under Viktor Orbán, Venezuela under Hugo Chávez, Russia under Vladimir Putin, and Turkey under Recep Tayyip Erdoğan within the same time frame of them taking office. However, the magazine noted that democratic institutions in the U.S. have proven more resistant to democratic backsliding than in those countries.

=== Public opinion ===
Bright Line surveys from the University of Chicago have taken frequent measurements on attitudes around democracy in the U.S. from political scientists and a representative sample of the public and have shown democratic decline consistent with V-Dem and The Economist Democracy Index.

Heading toward the 2024 elections, polls indicated that Democrats and Republicans alike had serious concerns about democratic backsliding, though often for starkly different reasons. FiveThirtyEight analysis of polls found most Democrats were concerned about the implications for democracy of a second Donald Trump presidency, while most Republicans were concerned about election integrity, as many Republicans continued to incorrectly believe that Joe Biden was not legitimately elected in 2020.

Public opinion research has begun to examine democratic norms in terms not only of losers' consent but also of winners' restraint.

== See also ==
- American decline
- Civil rights in the United States
  - History of civil rights in the United States
- Corruption in the United States
- Democracy in the Americas
- Guided democracy
- Human rights in the United States
- Imperial boomerang
- Freedom of the press in the United States
  - Timeline of government attacks on journalists in the United States
- Procedural democracy
- Solid South
- U.S. policy towards authoritarianism
- 2025–2026 United States redistricting
