= David Rockefeller Center for Latin American Studies =

Founded in 1994 by then-President Neil L. Rudenstine and alumnus David Rockefeller, the David Rockefeller Center for Latin American Studies (DRCLAS) is an inter-faculty initiative of Harvard University, with offices in Cambridge, Brazil, Chile, and Mexico. DRCLAS works to increase the knowledge of the cultures, economies, histories, environment and contemporary affairs of Latin America; foster cooperation and understanding among the peoples of the Americas; and contribute to democracy, social progress and sustainable development throughout the hemisphere. Through programs, grants, fellowships, and activities, DRCLAS strives to provide support and resources for students, faculty, and scholars working in and on Latin America.

The Center is currently led by Steven Levitsky, Harvard Professor of Government and author of How Democracies Die with fellow Harvard professor Daniel Ziblatt.

== Publications ==
The center publishes a book series, some of the titles in which are:

- Bitter Fruit: The Story of the American Coup in Guatemala
- Titu Cusi: A 16th Century Account of the Conquest
- Passing Lines: Sexuality and Immigration
