= Harvard Law & Policy Review =

- Discipline: Law, public policy
- Language: English

Publication details
- History: 2007-present
- Publisher: American Constitution Society for Law and Policy (United States)
- Frequency: Semiannual

Standard abbreviations
- Bluebook: Harv. L. & Pol'y Rev.
- ISO 4: Harv. Law Policy Rev.

Indexing
- ISSN: 1935-2077 (print); 1935-2107 (web)
- LCCN: 2006215757
- OCLC no.: 77275253

Links
- Journal homepage

The Harvard Law & Policy Review is a law journal and the official journal of the American Constitution Society, a progressive legal organization. It was established in 2007. The journal publishes two printed editions per year, as well as additional content posted exclusively online. It is edited by Harvard Law School students and typically has a staff of approximately 75 students. The journal publishes articles presenting progressive ideas for law and policy written by legal scholars, policymakers, practitioners, and students.

The journal is ranked 101 on the Washington & Lee Law Journal Rankings of the top 400 law journals published in the United States, making it the fifth-highest-ranked specialty law journal Harvard Law School.

The Harvard Law & Policy Review should not be confused with the Harvard Journal of Law and Public Policy, a forum for conservative and libertarian legal scholarship that serves as the official journal of the Federalist Society.

== Notable contributors ==
- Vice President Kamala Harris,
- Senator Elizabeth Warren,
- Chair of the Federal Trade Commission Lina Khan,
- Harvard Law School Professor Andrew Manuel Crespo,
- Chief Judge of the United States Court of Appeals for the First Circuit and Harvard Law School Professor David J. Barron,
- Senator Charles Schumer,
- Late Senator Ted Kennedy,
- Harvard Law School Professor Cass Sunstein,
- Former Secretary of Health and Human Services Kathleen Sebelius,
- Former Attorney General Janet Reno,
- Associate Justice of the California Supreme Court Goodwin Liu,
- Chief Judge of the New York State Court of Appeals Jonathan Lippman,
- Election law scholar Richard Hasen,
- Harvard Law School Professor Lani Guinier,
- Education advocate Randi Weingarten
- Education advocate Michelle Rhee,
- Retired Judge and Harvard Law School Professor Nancy Gertner,
- Columbia Law School professor and co-chair of Facebook's Oversight Board Jamal Greene,
- University of Chicago Law School Professor Aziz Huq,
- White House Chief of Staff Ron Klain,
- Harvard Law School Professor Guy-Uriel Charles,
- Harvard Law School Professor Nicholas Stephanopoulos,
- University of Michigan Law School Professor Samuel Bagenstos.
