= Constitutional hardball =

Questionable actions taken by political actors for personal gain

Constitutional hardball is the exploitation of procedures, laws and institutions by political actors for partisan gain in ways which violate current pre-established norms and push the bounds of legality. Legal scholars and political scientists have characterized constitutional hardball as a threat to democracy and can lead to democratic backsliding, because it undermines shared understanding of democratic norms and undermines the expectation that the other side will comply with democratic norms. As a result, the use of constitutional hardball by one side of partisans encourages other partisans to respond in similar fashion.

The concept stems from a 2004 article by Mark Tushnet of Harvard Law School. Harvard University political scientists Daniel Ziblatt and Steven Levitsky have argued that democracies such as Argentina under the rule of Juan Perón and Venezuela under the rule of Hugo Chávez shifted to authoritarianism in part through constitutional hardball, as both used legal court-packing schemes to cement power.

== In the United States ==
Examples of constitutional hardball include the use of the debt ceiling to force others to agree to one's demands (hostage-taking), disenfranchising voters for the opposing party (voter suppression), routine use of the filibuster, routine refusal of appointments, court-packing, actions by lame-duck administrations and legislatures to curb the powers of incoming legislators and administrations, using pardoning powers on oneself or one's associates, and refusal to commit to the peaceful transition of power.

David Pozen, Professor of Law at Columbia Law School, wrote in 2018 that "the concept of constitutional hardball seemed to be passing into common usage" in the United States.

It has been suggested that the use of constitutional hardball in the United States Congress has strengthened the role of the executive in policy-making, as the president becomes more likely to use the powers of office to circumvent the legislature; Obama's use of executive orders is mentioned as an example of constitutional hardball. In the 1990s, House Speaker Newt Gingrich's use of "asymmetric constitutional hardball" led to increasing polarization in American politics driven primarily by the Republican Party.

David A. Bateman has argued that constitutional hardball can serve a democracy-reinforcing function if done as a response to stop democratic backsliding.
