= How Democracies Die =

2018 book on threats to democracy

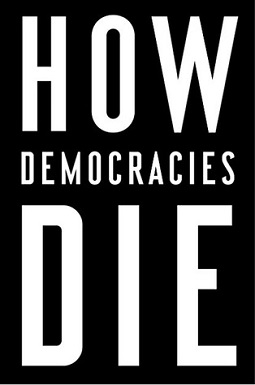
- First paperback edition
- Authors: Steven Levitsky, Daniel Ziblatt
- Cover artist: Christopher Brand
- Language: English
- Subjects: Politics; Political theory Comparative politics Political science
- Publisher: Crown (publisher)
- Publication date: 16 January 2018
- Publication place: United States
- Media type: Print (hardcover, paperback, e-book, audio book)
- Pages: 320
- ISBN: 978-1-5247-6293-3
- OCLC: 1082520793
- Dewey Decimal: 321.8
- LC Class: JC423 .L4855

How Democracies Die is a 2018 comparative politics book by Harvard political scientists Steven Levitsky and Daniel Ziblatt about democratic backsliding, and how elected leaders can gradually subvert the democratic process to increase their power. The book examines the political systems in countries such as Venezuela, Russia, Turkey, Thailand, Hungary and Poland, and also offers stark warnings about the first Donald Trump presidency which, in the authors' view, imperils U.S. democracy.

The book was a widely praised bestseller. In 2023, Levitsky and Ziblatt published a sequel of sorts, titled Tyranny of the Minority. It provides an update on the global prospects for democracy, with a focus on counter-majoritarian devices being deployed in the U.S. to prevent democratic rule by the majority.

== Synopsis ==
How Democracies Die cites cases in multiple countries where a breakdown of "mutual toleration" occurred, along with a loss of respect for the political legitimacy of the opposition. Tolerance, as the authors define it, involves accepting the results of a free and fair election when the opposition has won, in contrast with lodging spurious complaints about the election mechanism or even advocating the overthrow of the electoral system. The authors stress the importance of respecting the opinions of people with different political viewpoints, rather than attacking the patriotism of the opposition, or warning that if they come to power they will destroy the country.

The authors claim that in a system with separation of powers, the various branches of government have actions available to them which can undermine the other branches. The authors caution against ramming through a political agenda or accumulating power by playing "constitutional hardball" with tactics like court-packing, stonewalling nominations, or abusing the power of the purse. Instead, the authors recommend "forbearance" and some degree of cooperation to keep government functioning in a balanced fashion. Among the other threats to democratic stability, they list economic inequality and segregation of the political parties by race, religion, and geography.

After applying their theory of how democracies die to Latin American and European countries (especially Venezuela and Russia), the authors devote later chapters to the United States, Donald Trump, the Republican Party, and the 2016 presidential election. The book argues that up until 2016, the U.S. resisted attempts to destabilize its democracy thanks to two norms: mutual toleration and institutional forbearance, the latter phrase defined as "avoiding actions that, while respecting the letter of the law, obviously violate its spirit. Where norms of forbearance are strong, politicians do not use their institutional prerogatives to the hilt, even if it is technically legal to do so, for such action could imperil the existing system." But the authors see those two norms under assault:

The traditions underpinning America's democratic institutions are unraveling, opening up a disconcerting gap between how our political system works and long-standing expectations about how it ought to work. As our soft guardrails have weakened, we have grown increasingly vulnerable to antidemocratic leaders.

The book concludes with three potential scenarios for a post-Trump America.

== Analysis ==
Levitsky and Ziblatt adopt an holistic approach in explaining the process by which democracies die, and in studying the long-term prospects of democratic systems. The book's key concerns are outlined in the introduction: the authors assert that in the early 21st century, democracies still die as in the previous century, but by different means than before, less "at the hands of men with guns", and more by elected leaders. As a methodology, the authors rely mainly on the "comparative method". They seek to forecast the future based on historical comparisons: finding similar dynamics and cases where history "rhymes", presenting models of "gatekeeping", and so on.

They sharply criticize Trump's first presidency, characterizing him as someone "with a dubious allegiance to democratic norms", and comparing him with autocrats past and present. The book assesses the risk of his presidency and tries to identify a pattern in his authoritarian tendencies.

=== Recommendations of the authors ===
Levitsky and Ziblatt argue that the dangers of a Trump presidency are real, and advocate for the protection of U.S. democracy with the following advice:

We must be humble and bold. We must learn from other countries to see the warning signs—and recognize the false alarms. We must be aware of the fateful missteps that have wrecked other democracies. And we must see how citizens have risen to meet the great democratic crises of the past, overcoming their own deep-seated divisions to avert breakdown.

They exhort Americans "to restore the basic norms that once protected" the nation's democracy: "But we must do more than that. We must extend those norms through the whole of a diverse society. We must make them truly inclusive."

The authors offer recommendations for Republicans, who first must realize that President Trump "could inflict real damage on our institutions in the long term." In addition, the party "must build a more diverse electoral constituency ... and they must find ways to win elections without appealing to white nationalism, or what Republican Arizona senator Jeff Flake calls 'the sugar high of populism, nativism, and demagoguery.'" Regarding Democrats, the authors write: "Although the Democratic Party has not been the principal driver of America's deepening polarization, it could nevertheless play a role in reducing it." They urge the party to consider "more comprehensive labor market policies ... it is imperative that Democrats address the issue of inequality. It is, after all, more than a question of social justice. The very health of our democracy hinges on it."

In a 2018 interview, Levitsky summarized the book's two objectives as defeating Trump in 2020, and shoring up U.S. democracy. After the start of the second Trump presidency, Levitsky commented that the U.S. had already slid into a form of competitive authoritarianism.

== Reception ==
The Economist stated that How Democracies Die was arguably "the most important book of the Trump era". The New York Times termed it an essential guide to what can happen in the U.S. John Ikenberry in Foreign Affairs characterized the book as a powerful wake-up call, and The Washington Post said it is a sober look at the current state of political affairs, In a scholarly review, political theorist Rosolino A. Candela praised the book and asserted that academics will find much in it "to learn, unpack, and develop".

How Democracies Die made The New York Times bestseller list, and was helped by favorable publicity from prominent Democrats. Joe Biden read the book in 2018, sometimes carrying it with him that year to share passages. Barack Obama included it on his "Favorite Books of 2018" list. The book was awarded with the German NDR Kultur Sachbuchpreis 2018.

In an otherwise laudatory review, Jason Willick in The Wall Street Journal faulted Levitsky and Ziblatt for demonizing Republican politicians such as Ted Cruz and, in so doing, "offer an unintentionally clarifying lesson in how democratic politics unravels". David Runciman in The Guardian called the book provocative, but argued that it puts too much emphasis on lessons from history, while underestimating other factors that weaken democracies like inequality, and the influence of social media: "I say this as a historian: if we want to know how our democracies might die, we have to stop looking to our yesterdays". While praising How Democracies Die as the "most thought-provoking book comparing democratic crises in different nations", Columbia University professor Adam Tooze faulted the authors for downplaying the use of force, both in destroying democracies and in reviving them:

For all their facility as analysts of political procedure and form, Levitsky and Ziblatt are strikingly naive when it comes to power. The overthrow of Chilean democracy in 1973 was not merely a deterioration into extreme partisanship. It was a violent clash over fundamental social and economic reforms during the cold war. Among the forces that enabled the destruction of Chilean democracy were the security and foreign policy apparatuses of the United States. Likewise in Germany, as Levitsky and Ziblatt admit, it took the absolute defeat of Hitler's regime in 1945 to set the conditions for the reconstruction of German conservatism.... For the GOP to transform itself, will America need to experience a catastrophe similar to that of Germany in World War II? Levitsky and Ziblatt pose the question but never fully explore its implications.

== See also ==
- Democratic backsliding in the United States
- Autocratic legalism

== Bibliography ==
- Berman, S. (2018). A Discussion of Steven Levitsky and Daniel Ziblatt’s How Democracies Die. Perspectives on Politics, 16(4), 1092-1094. doi:10.1017/S1537592718002852
- Bunce, V. (2018). A Discussion of Steven Levitsky and Daniel Ziblatt's How Democracies Die. Perspectives on Politics, 16(4), 1103–1104. doi:10.1017/S1537592718002839
- Connolly, W. (2018). A Discussion of Steven Levitsky and Daniel Ziblatt's How Democracies Die. Perspectives on Politics, 16(4), 1095–1096. doi:10.1017/S1537592718002888
- Cramer, K. (2018). A Discussion of Steven Levitsky and Daniel Ziblatt's How Democracies Die. Perspectives on Politics, 16(4), 1097–1098. doi:10.1017/S1537592718002876
- Ikenberry, G. John (2018). "How Democracies Die". Foreign Affairs. No. March/April.
- Levitsky, Steven; Ziblatt, Daniel (2018). How Democracies Die. New York: Crown. ISBN 978-1524762933.
- Parker, C. (2018). A Discussion of Steven Levitsky and Daniel Ziblatt's How Democracies Die. Perspectives on Politics, 16(4), 1099–1100. doi:10.1017/S153759271800289X
- Pérez-Liñán, A. (2018). A Discussion of Steven Levitsky and Daniel Ziblatt's How Democracies Die. Perspectives on Politics, 16(4), 1101–1102. doi:10.1017/S1537592718003043
