= Conservative Parties and the Birth of Democracy =

2017 non-fiction book by Daniel Ziblatt

- Author: Daniel Ziblatt
- Subject: Politics
- Genre: Non-fiction
- Set in: German; United Kingdom
- Publisher: Cambridge University Press
- Publication date: 2017

Conservative Parties and the Birth of Democracy is a 2017 non-fiction book by Daniel Ziblatt, published by Cambridge University Press, discussing the growth of democratic countries in 19th and 20th century Europe. Ziblatt's thesis is that in those democracies the conservative parties were often crucial on whether a democracy survives: he analysed both Germany and the United Kingdom. Ziblatt argued that if conservative parties were robust they would assist democracy but if they had weaknesses they would impede democracy.

John Markoff, in the American Journal of Sociology, wrote that "Ziblatt shines his spotlight on how those who had held economic and political power in the past attempted to keep on doing so and on how they innovated in order to keep essential things unchanged." Markoff states that, according to the book, "an antidemocratic right" is the faction that "prevails in democracy's crises" and that according to the book "democracy's stability depends on keeping 'the propertied and powerful' (p. 368) content". Seva Gunitsky, in Perspectives on Politics, wrote that, as per the book, established conservative parties are crucial elements in changes in politics that lack violence and that such parties perceive democracy "as a gamble—a risky one, to be sure, but one on which they could place their own bets, and even win".

== Background ==
Ziblatt is a political scientist. The book uses both statistics and archives as sources. Ziblatt did much of his research whilst in the basement of the Hatfield House.

== Contents ==
The book's initial portion describes a crisis of the British Conservative Party circa 1906 and the German National People's Party. The author argues that the British discovered how a political party could continue the influence of the existing conservatives, and that the British party had stronger organization than the equivalent in 20th century Germany. Mark Koyama, in The Journal of Economic History, stated that "The British case-study foregrounds the main components of Ziblatt’s argument." The content about the UK has three chapters.

The content about Germany, in the second part of the book, has about four chapters. Hermann Beck of the University of Miami states that "the lion's share" of the content is about those two countries.

In addition to the United Kingdom and Germany the book, in a third section, has content about post-1879 France, Italy, Latin America, Sweden, and Spain, as well as other parts of Scandinavia. The author stated that the countries that had conservative parties developing similarly to the British one accordingly had more democracy, using Sweden as an example of the British model.

Frieder Günther of the Institute of Contemporary History said that the manner of writing was "institutional".

== Reception ==
Gunitsky stated that the book "accomplishes" its argument on how democracy developed on the continent, "usefully critiques explanations that emphasize economic development or the role of the working class" and "is an exemplary case of a deeply researched controlled comparison, one that performs the valuable service of offering paths to more questions." Gunitsky argued that the book does not adequately explore "external forces" and international relations, but that "These are perhaps unfair demands to make of" the work. Citing changes in the United States Republican Party, Gunitsky added "Although Donald Trump does not appear anywhere in the book, his specter looms over the argument." In response to Gunitsky's point about Eastern European parties, Ziblatt stated "The existence of strong autocrat parties is not a refutation of my thesis but, rather, an illustration of what happens over time when strong center-right parties are missing."

Günther wrote that the book presented a "viable argument" and that "All in all, the book's scope is impressive."

According to Koyama, the work is "a powerful and comprehensive account of the divergent political trajectories of Britain and Germany in the nineteenth and twentieth centuries."

Markoff stated that the book was "splendid".

Jorgen Møller of Aarhus University wrote that the study of Denmark's conservative party could be a rebuttal to the book's thesis.

J. M. Stonecash of Syracuse University gave the book three stars and stated it was "highly recommended". He added that it had "persuasive", "considerable evidence".

Beck described it as "well-written" and "astute".
