= American Constitution Society =

US progressive legal organization

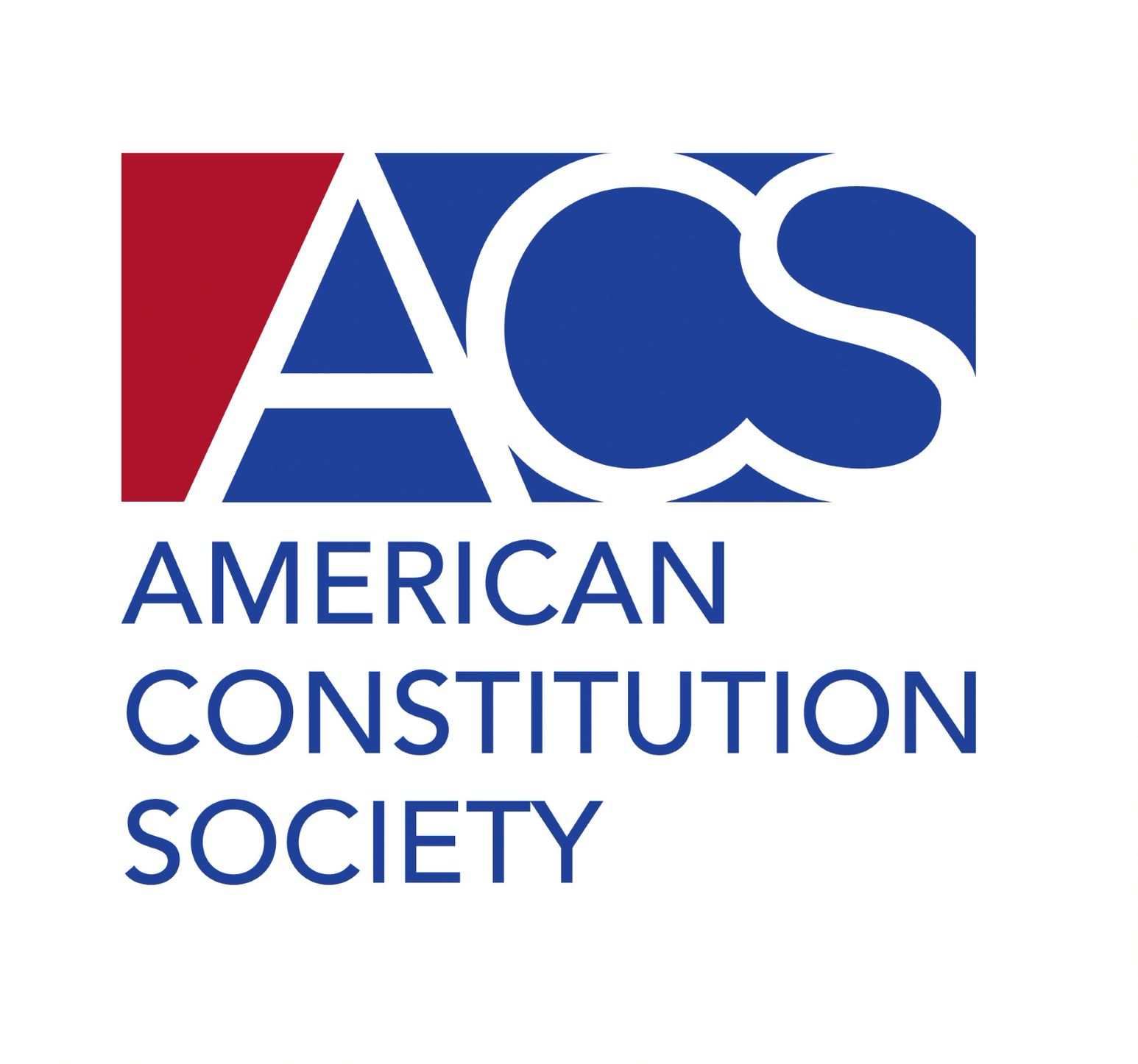
- American Constitution Society Logo
- Formation: 2001; 25 years ago
- Founded at: Georgetown University
- Type: Legal
- Legal status: 501(c)(3) nonprofit
- Purpose: Political advocacy
- Location(s): 601 13th St, NW, Suite 610; Washington, D.C.
- Coordinates: 38.900°N 77.031°W
- President: Phil Brest
- Budget: $4.73 million (2024)
- Website: acslaw.org

The American Constitution Society (ACS) is a progressive legal organization. ACS was created as a counterweight to, and is modeled after, the Federalist Society, and is often described as its progressive counterpart.

ACS hosts conferences, sponsors chapters of law students and practicing attorneys, engages in education projects, and advocates for progressive judicial nominations.

Founded in 2001 following the U.S. Supreme Court decision Bush v. Gore, ACS is headquartered in Washington, D.C. Former Democratic U.S. Senator Russ Feingold served as the organization's president from 2020 to 2025.

The group's stated mission is "to support and advocate for laws and legal systems that redress the founding failures of our Constitution, strengthen our democratic legitimacy, uphold the rule of law, and realize the promise of equality for all, including people of color, women, LGBTQ+ people, people with disabilities, and other historically excluded communities."

== History and leadership ==
The American Constitution Society was founded in 2001 by Peter J. Rubin, a jurist who served as counsel to Al Gore in the legal battle over the 2000 election. The group was originally known as the Madison Society for Law and Policy. The organization was formed as a counterweight to the conservative Federalist Society. It was founded in order to build a network of progressive lawyers and foster new avenues of progressive legal thought. ACS received its initial funding from the William and Flora Hewlett Foundation. The Democracy Alliance lists ACS as a recommended funding recipient.

In 2008, ACS's executive director, Lisa Brown, went on leave to serve on the Barack Obama transition team. She headed the president-elect's agency review team and later served as the first White House Staff Secretary in the Obama White House.

Caroline Fredrickson was the group's president from 2009 to 2019.

Members of the organization's board of directors have included David Halperin, a speechwriter in the Bill Clinton administration who also served as the organization's founding executive director from 2001 to 2003; and Eric Holder, former Attorney General of the United States. Among the organization's former board chairs is California Supreme Court Judge Goodwin Liu.

== Activities ==
In 2009, ACS published Keeping Faith with the Constitution by Pamela S. Karlan, Goodwin Liu, and Christopher H. Schroeder. It was re-issued by Oxford University Press in 2010. The book serves as a primer for progressives interested in promoting liberal constitutionalism.

On November 14, 2018, the American Constitution Society released a letter signed by over 1,600 attorneys nationwide calling for lawmakers and Justice Department officials to protect the special counsel's Russia probe in light of Matthew Whitaker's appointment as acting attorney general. The signatories call for Whitaker to recuse himself or "otherwise be removed from overseeing the Mueller investigation as a result of his profound ethical conflicts."

In 2019, Politico magazine published an article by legal academic Evan Mandery titled "Why There's No Liberal Federalist Society." The article noted that while the ACS's operations mirror the Federalist Society's, "The playing field is decidedly not level. The Federalist Society has more student chapters, more than twice as many lawyer chapters and a huge fundraising edge. In 2016, ACS had total revenues of approximately $6.5 million, while the Federalist Society took in $26.7 million. And the relative impact of the organizations can hardly be compared. The federal and state judiciaries are filled with Federalist judges, but there are no 'ACS' judges to be found on the Supreme Court or the federal benches. It's just not a thing." Mandery writes that the liberal legal academy "hasn't come up with an easily digestible rival idea" to the originalism of the Federalist Society, and that the ACS's "focus on outcomes rather than first principles immediately colors it with politics."

== See also ==
- Harvard Law and Policy Review
- Alliance for Justice
- Brennan Center for Justice
- Justice at Stake
- National Lawyers Guild
- Constitution of the United States
