= Brennan Center for Justice =

Law and public policy institute at New York University School of Law

- Established: 1995; 31 years ago
- Location: New York City; Washington, D.C.
- President: Michael Waldman
- Board of directors: Kimberley D. Harris (co-chair); Christine A. Varney (co-chair)
- Revenue: $57.9 million (2024)
- Expenses: $50.6 million (2024)
- Endowment: $313 million (2024)
- Website: www.brennancenter.org

The Brennan Center for Justice is an American modern liberal nonprofit law and public policy institute. The organization is named after Supreme Court justice William J. Brennan Jr. The Brennan Center advocates for public policy positions including raising the minimum wage, opposing voter ID laws, and calling for public funding of elections. Its operations are centered at the New York University School of Law. The organization opposed the U.S. Supreme Court's ruling in Citizens United v. FEC, which held that the First Amendment prohibits the government from restricting independent political expenditures by nonprofit organizations.

The stated mission of the Brennan Center is to "work to hold our political institutions and laws accountable to the twin American ideals of democracy and equal justice for all". Its president is Michael Waldman, former speechwriter for President Bill Clinton.

== History and mission ==
The Brennan Center for Justice was founded in 1995 by the family and former law clerks of Supreme Court justice William J. Brennan Jr., whom The Washington Post called "the progressive voice of the modern court". Justice Brennan's idea of a living constitution figures largely into the center's work. The Brennan Center started with an initial grant by the Carnegie Corporation of New York of $25,000 in 1996. The Carnegie Corporation in years since has donated over $3,650,000. During the selection process of what school to center operations from, the Brennan Center selected New York University School of Law (NYU Law) out of a choice of three schools, with the other two being Georgetown University and Harvard University.

The Brennan Center is part think tank, part public interest law firm, and part advocacy group. The organization is involved in issues such as opposing voter ID laws that it believes unduly restrict voter registration, and other barriers to registration and voting, and advocates for redistricting reform and campaign finance reform.

== Activities ==
The Brennan Center's work is divided into three programs—Democracy, Justice, and Liberty & National Security. Past programs focused on criminal justice, poverty, and economic justice. The organization has focus on issues both at the national level in the United States but also at the state and local levels of government.

The Brennan Center opposes mass incarceration and produces research on causes of violent crime in the United States. The Brennan Center has represented several detainees at the Guantanamo Bay detention camp, and also U.S. citizens or legal residents held as unlawful enemy combatants. Attorneys from the Brennan Center challenged a U.S. president's authority to declare a prisoner to be an unlawful enemy combatant in the war on terror. They have also challenged the U.S. Congress's power to deny habeas corpus to such prisoners.

The Brennan Center assisted in drafting and enacting the Bipartisan Campaign Reform Act of 2002 (BCRA). The law banned soft money contributions to political campaigns. The organization helped Senator Dick Durbin write the Fair Elections Now Act.

The Brennan Center advocated for the passage in 2010 of New York's law ending prison-based gerrymandering, and was part of a coalition of organizations that sought to defend that law from a court challenge. The Brennan Center advocates for the restoration of felon voting rights.

The Brennan Center represented plaintiffs Margarita López Torres, other unsuccessful judicial candidates, and Common Cause, in a lawsuit that challenged the way New York state trial judge candidates gain access to the ballot. They prevailed in the U.S. District Court and in the U.S. Court of Appeals for the 2nd Circuit. In 2007, attorneys from the Brennan Center argued N.Y. State Bd. of Elections v. Lopez Torres before the United States Supreme Court. In 2008, the court ruled for the state.

In 2015, the Brennan Center submitted an amicus curiae brief with the Supreme Court of Wisconsin, urging the state not to overturn John Doe law, which allows the state to conduct criminal investigations in secret.

The Brennan Center has been tracking states' legislation on voter ID laws and other barriers to voter registration and voting to determine whether there is undue burden carried by certain communities. Numerous lawsuits have been brought against states in such cases. By August 1, 2016, rulings in five cases: Ohio, Texas, North Carolina, Wisconsin, and North Dakota, overturned certain voter ID and other provisions, requiring states to make alternatives acceptable for the November 2016 election cycle. The Brennan Center research has also indicated that instances of voter fraud by citizens and non-citizens are very rare. In 2021, the Brennan Center represented Ohio citizens groups in their efforts to stop gerrymandering and, after winning judgments in the state Supreme Court did not improve district maps, the Center supported a 2024 ballot initiative.

In 2023, the Brennan Center surveyed election administrators, finding many plan on retiring before the 2024 presidential election.

The Brennan Center filed a friend of the court briefing in the U.S. Supreme Court in the case of Moore v. Harper. In oral arguments on December 7, 2022, the Brennan Center urged the United States Supreme Court to allow the North Carolina Supreme Court to strike down the state legislature’s congressional map for violating the North Carolina Constitution.

The Brennan Center for Justice is a partner organization of VoteRiders. In 2024, the Brennan Center, VoteRiders, and other organizations released research on proof of citizenship in the U.S., finding that more than 21 million Americans would not be able to quickly locate a passport, birth certificate, or naturalization papers as proof of citizenship within 24 hours. The research also concluded that nearly four million American citizens (two percent of U.S. citizens) lack access to any form of proof in citizenship. Later in 2024, the Brennan Center also released a report focused on state-by-state redesigns of election rules in the aftermath of the 2020 election.

In 2025, the Brennan Center filed a lawsuit on behalf of a coalition of voting rights organizations, including the League of Women Voters and the NAACP, challenging President Trump's Preserving and Protecting the Integrity of American Elections executive order, which directs the Election Assistance Commission to require documentary proof of citizenship for the federal voter registration form.

== Funding ==
As of the Brennan Center's 2025 annual report, the organization has received funding from:

- Arnold & Porter
- Arnold Ventures
- Barbra Streisand
- Carnegie Corporation of New York
- Comcast NBCUniversal
- Cooley LLP
- Democracy Fund
- Equal Justice Works
- Ford Foundation
- Greater Washington Community Foundation
- Heising-Simons Foundation
- Hogan Lovells
- Joyce Foundation
- JPMorgan Chase
- Larry Rockefeller
- Liberty Hill Foundation
- Lowenstein Center for the Public Interest
- MacArthur Foundation
- Democracy Fund
- National Basketball Association
- Overbrook Foundation
- Park Foundation
- Princeton Area Community Foundation
- Rockefeller Brothers Fund
- Salesforce
- Schwab Charitable
- Steptoe & Johnson
- Tides Foundation
- Vanguard Charitable
- William and Flora Hewlett Foundation

== See also ==
- Alliance for Justice
- American Constitution Society
- Justice at Stake
