= Justice at Stake =

- Founded: 2000
- Dissolved: June 16, 2017
- Purpose: Judiciary
- Location: Washington, D.C.
- Website: justiceatstake.org

Justice at Stake was a judicial advocacy organization active in the United States from 2000 to 2017. The group advocated for an end to judicial elections, and for stricter regulations regarding campaign finance for state-level judicial races. George Soros was one of the organization's primary donors.

== Background ==
Founded in 2000, Justice at Stake was a 501(c)(3) organization governed by a board of directors. The chair of the board was Mark I. Harrison. The organization announced its closure on June 16, 2017.

Justice at Stake advocated for judicial appointments rather than judicial elections. It also advocated for reforms such as public financing of judicial elections and stricter campaign finance regulations regarding state judicial races.

== See also ==
- Alliance for Justice
- American Constitution Society
- Brennan Center for Justice
