= Princeton Area Community Foundation =

Community foundation

The Princeton Area Community Foundation (PACF), established in 1991, is a community foundation based in Lawrenceville, New Jersey that serves Mercer County and central New Jersey. The community foundation is devoted to the well-being of people in the region, providing organizational support to individuals, families, businesses, and organizations who wish to create permanent charitable funds. The grants help fund programs in education, the arts, housing, environment, community development, and human services. The PACF invests and oversees the charitable funds while awarding grants and scholarships, promoting philanthropy, and supporting Central Jersey's local nonprofit sector.

== Special awards ==
The following special awards are administered by the PACF:

- Rebecca Annitto's Service Opportunities for Students (SOS) Fund Internship Award
- Diana Rochford Memorial Fund Service Award Internship Award
- Thomas George Artists Fund Award
