= Steven Levitsky =

American political scientist

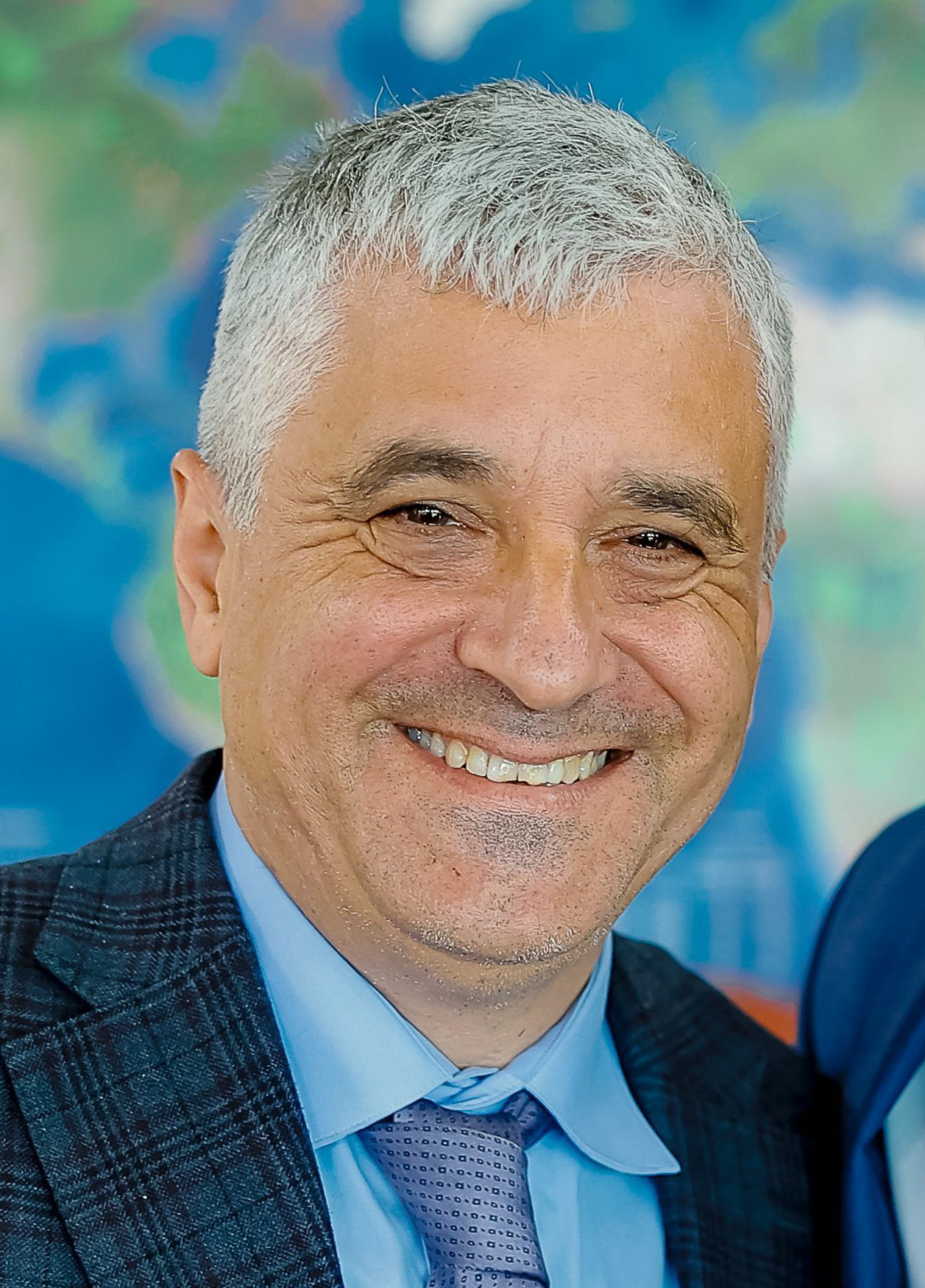
- Levitsky in 2025
- Born: January 17, 1968 (age 58)
- Education: Stanford University (BA); University of California, Berkeley (PhD)
- Known for: Competitive authoritarianism Informal institutions
- Scientific career
- Fields: Political science
- Workplaces: Harvard University (2000–present)
- Doctoral advisor: David Collier

Steven Robert Levitsky (born January 17, 1968) is an American political scientist and professor of government at Harvard University and a senior fellow for democracy at the Council on Foreign Relations. He is also a senior fellow at the Kettering Foundation, an American non-partisan research foundation.

A comparative political scientist, his research interests focus on Latin America and include political parties and party systems, authoritarianism and democratization, and weak and informal institutions.

He is notable for his work on competitive authoritarian regimes and informal political institutions. An expert on Latin America, Levitsky co-authored the 2018 best seller How Democracies Die with Daniel Ziblatt (an expert on authoritarianism in interwar Europe), warning that Donald Trump and the Republican Party were engaging in rhetoric and actions that have parallels with the breakdown of democracy in other regions and historical periods.

== Early life ==
Levitsky was raised in Ithaca, New York. His father was a professor of psychology at Cornell University.

He studied Spanish in high school and became aware of the Reagan administration policies toward Central America. As an undergraduate, he took some courses about Latin America and "fell in love with the region". In the summer of 1989, he visited Managua, Nicaragua, to do research for his senior thesis.

Levitsky received a B.A. in political science from Stanford University in 1990 and a Ph.D. in political science from the University of California, Berkeley, in 1999.

== Academic career ==
=== Career ===
After obtaining his Ph.D. in 1999, Levitsky was a visiting fellow at the University of Notre Dame's Kellogg Institute for International Studies. The next year, he joined Harvard University as an assistant professor of government. There he went on to serve as the John L. Loeb Associate Professor of the Social Sciences (2004–2008) before receiving tenure as a full professor of government in 2008. Although he had enjoyed living and studying in the San Francisco Bay Area, he always identified more strongly with the East Coast and was happy to return east when he joined Harvard.

At Harvard, Levitsky also sits on the executive committees of the Weatherhead Center for International Affairs and the David Rockefeller Center for Latin American Studies. He is an advisor to several student organizations, including the Harvard Association Cultivating Inter-American Democracy (HACIA Democracy).

=== Research ===
Levitsky is known for his work with University of Toronto professor Lucan Way on "competitive authoritarian" regimes: hybrid government types in which, on the one hand, democratic institutions are generally accepted as the means to obtaining and exercising political power, but, on the other hand, incumbents violate the norms of those institutions so routinely, and to such an extent, that the regime fails to meet basic standards for democracy; under such a system, incumbents almost always retain power, because they control and tend to use the state to squelch opposition, arresting or intimidating opponents, controlling media coverage, or tampering with election results. Writing about the phenomenon in 2002, Levitsky and Way named Serbia under Slobodan Milošević and Russia under Vladimir Putin as examples of such regimes. When collaborating, Levitsky brings his expertise on Latin America while Way brings his on countries of the former Soviet Union.

In 2018, Levitsky published How Democracies Die with fellow Harvard professor Daniel Ziblatt. The book examines the conditions that may lead democracies to break down from within, rather than due to external events such as military coups or foreign invasions. How Democracies Die received widespread praise. It spent a number of weeks on The New York Times Best Seller list and six weeks on the non-fiction bestseller list of the German weekly Der Spiegel. The book was recognized as one of the best nonfiction books of 2018 by the Washington Post, Time, and Foreign Affairs. Levitsky and Ziblatt have co-authored numerous opinion articles on American democracy in the New York Times.

== Personal life ==
Levitsky is married to Liz Mineo, a Peruvian journalist with degrees from the National University of San Marcos and Columbia University who currently works at The Harvard Gazette. They live with their daughter in Brookline, Massachusetts. Levitsky is Jewish.

== Awards and honors ==
- Awarded the 2019 Goldsmith Book Prize by the Harvard Shorenstein Center for How Democracies Die along with Daniel Ziblatt
- Awarded the 2019 Global Policy Book Award by the Loyola Marymount Global Policy Institute for How Democracies Die
- Awarded the 2023 Juan Linz Best Book Prize by the American Political Science Association for Revolution and Dictatorship along with Lucan Way
- Named a 2024 Walter Channing Cabot Fellow by the Harvard Faculty of Arts and Sciences
- Winner of the Harvard Hillel's 2025 Latke vs. Hamantasch Debate

== Selected bibliography ==
=== Books ===
- 2023. Tyranny of the Minority: Why American Democracy Reached the Breaking Point. (with Daniel Ziblatt). New York. Crown. ISBN 978-0-593-44307-1
- 2022. Revolution and Dictatorship: The Violent Origins of Durable Authoritarianism. (with Lucan Way). Princeton University Press.
- 2018. How Democracies Die. (with Daniel Ziblatt). New York: Crown. ISBN 978-1-5247-6293-3. – NDR Kultur Sachbuchpreis 2018; Goldsmith Book Prize 2019
- 2010. Competitive Authoritarianism: Hybrid Regimes after the Cold War. (with Lucan A. Way). New York: Cambridge University Press. ISBN 978-0-521-88252-1.
- 2006. Informal Institutions and Democracy: Lessons from Latin America. (edited with Gretchen Helmke). Baltimore: Johns Hopkins University Press. ISBN 978-0-8018-8351-4.
- 2005. Argentine Democracy: The Politics of Institutional Weakness. (edited with M. Victoria Murillo). University Park: Penn State University Press. ISBN 978-0-271-02715-9.
- 2003. Transforming Labor-Based Parties in Latin America: Argentine Peronism in Comparative Perspective. New York: Cambridge University Press. ISBN 978-0-521-81677-9. [Published in Spanish as Transformación del Justicialismo: Del Partido Sindical al Partido Clientelista. Buenos Aires: Siglo XXI, 2005]

=== Journal articles ===
- 2025. "The Path to American Authoritarianism: What Comes After Democratic Breakdown" (with Lucan A. Way). Foreign Affairs. 11 February 2025.
- His articles since 2009
- 2009. “Variation in Institutional Strength: Causes and Implications” (with María Victoria Murillo). Annual Review of Political Science. 12: 115-133.
- 2007. "Organizacion Informal de los Partidos en America Latina" [Informal Party Organization in Latin America] (with Flavia Freidenberg). Desarrollo Económico (Argentina) 46, No. 184: 539-568.
- 2007. “Linkage, Leverage and the Post-Communist Divide” (with Lucan A. Way). East European Politics and Societies 27, No. 21: 48-66.
- 2006. “The Dynamics of Autocratic Coercive Capacity after the Cold War” (with Lucan Way). Communist and Post-Communist Studies 39, No. 3: 387-410.
- 2006. “Organized Labor and Democracy in Latin America” (with Scott Mainwaring). Comparative Politics 39, No. 1 (October): 21-42.
- 2006. “Linkage versus Leverage: Rethinking the International Dimension of Regime Change” (with Lucan Way). Comparative Politics 38, No. 4 (July): 379-400.
- 2005. “International Linkage and Democratization” (with Lucan Way). Journal of Democracy. 16, No. 3 (July): 20-34.
- 2004. “Informal Institutions and Comparative Politics: A Research Agenda” (with Gretchen Helmke). Perspectives on Politics 2, No. 4 (December): 725-740.
- 2003. “Argentina Weathers the Storm” (with M. Victoria Murillo). Journal of Democracy 14, No. 4 (October): 152-166.
- 2003. “From Labor Politics to Machine Politics: The Transformation of Party-Union Linkages in Argentine Peronism, 1983-99.” Latin American Research Review 38, No. 3: 3-36. [Also published in Desarrollo Económico, Argentina]
- 2003. “Explaining Populist Party Adaptation in Latin America: Environmental and Organizational Determinants of Party Change in Argentina, Mexico, Peru, and Venezuela” (with Katrina Burgess). Comparative Political Studies 36, No. 8 (October): 859-880.
- 2003. “Democracy without Parties? Political Parties and Regime Change in Fujimori's Peru” (with Maxwell Cameron). Latin American Politics and Society 45, No. 3 (Fall): 1-33. [Also published in Instituciones y Desarrollo, Spain]
- 2002. “Elections Without Democracy: The Rise of Competitive Authoritarianism” (with Lucan Way). Journal of Democracy 13, No. 2 (April): 51-66. [Also published in Estudios Políticos, Columbia, Vol. 24, July 2004]
- 2001. “Organization and Labor-Based Party Adaptation: The Transformation of Argentine Peronism in Comparative Perspective.” World Politics 54, No. 1 (October): 27-56.
- 2001. “Inside the Black Box: Recent Studies of Latin American Party Organizations.” Studies in Comparative International Development 36, No. 2 (summer): 92-110.
- 2001. “An ‘Organized Disorganization’: Informal Organization and the Persistence of Local Party Structures in Argentine Peronism.” Journal of Latin American Studies 33, No. 1 (February): 29-66. [Also published in Revista de Ciencias Sociales, Argentina, October 2001]
- 2000. “The ‘Normalization’ of Argentine Politics.” Journal of Democracy 11, No. 2 (April): 56-69.
- 1999. “Fujimori and Post-Party Politics in Peru.” Journal of Democracy 10, No. 3 (July): 78-92.
- 1998. “Crisis, Party Adaptation, and Regime Stability in Argentina: The Case of Peronism, 1989-1995.” Party Politics 4, No. 4: 445-470. [Also published in Revista de Ciencias Sociales, Argentina, September 1997]
- 1998. “Between a Shock and a Hard Place: The Dynamics of Labor-Backed Adjustment in Argentina and Poland” (with Lucan Way). Comparative Politics 30, No. 2 (January): 171-192.
- 1998. “Institutionalization and Peronism: The Case, the Concept, and the Case for Unpacking the Concept.” Party Politics 4, No. 1 (January): 77-92.
- 1997. “Democracy with Adjectives: Conceptual Innovation in Comparative Research” (with David Collier), World Politics 49, No. 3 (April): 430-51. [Also published in Rivista Italiana di Scienza Politica, December 1997; Agora, Buenos Aires, January 1998; and La Politica, Barcelona, October 1998]
- 1991. “FSLN Congress: A Cautious First Step.” Journal of Communist Studies 7, No. 4 (December): 539-544.
