= Aziz Huq =

American legal scholar

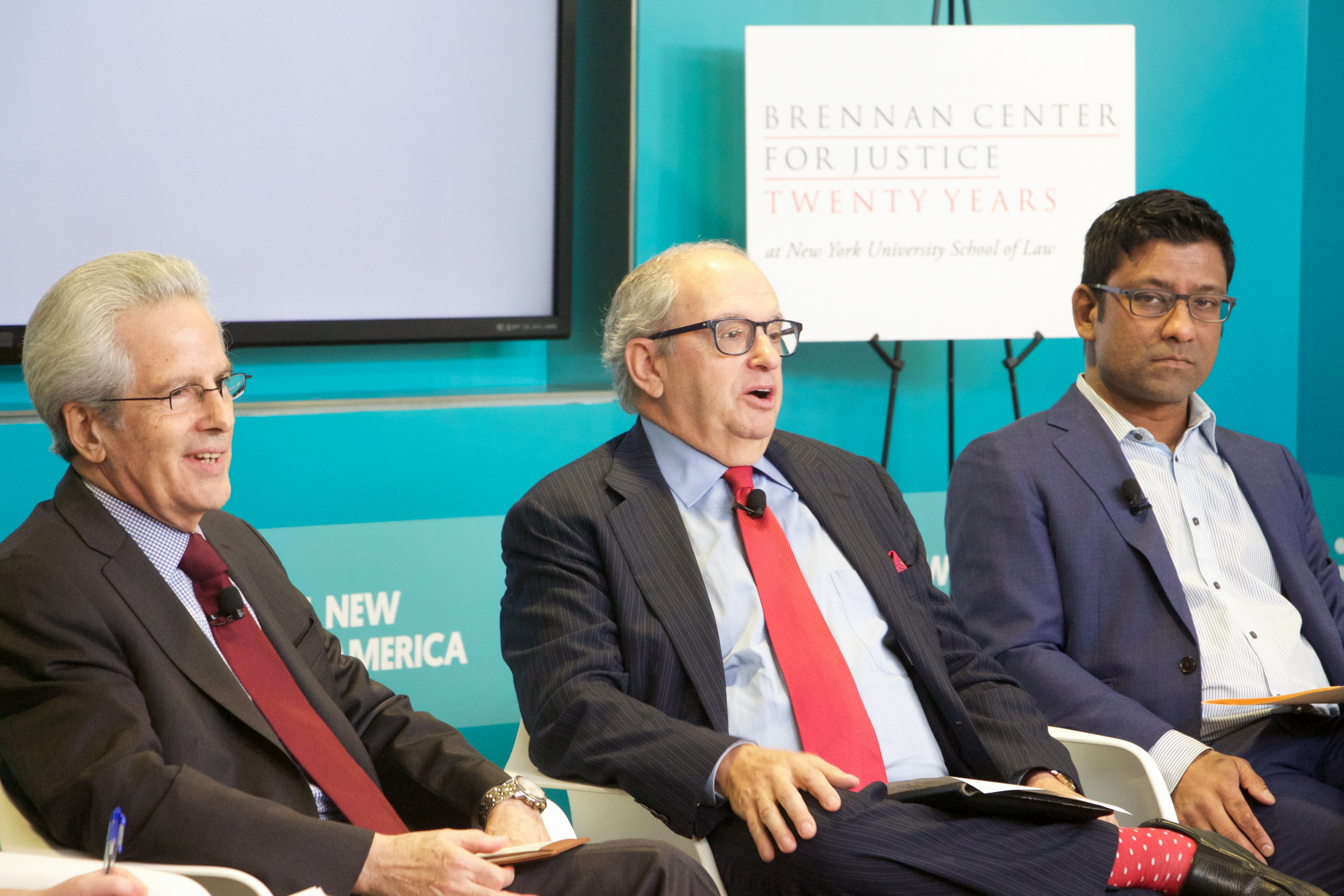
- Huq (right) seated with Arturo Valenzuela (left) and Norman Ornstein (center) in 2017
- Known for: Constitutional law criminal procedure

Academic background
- Education: University of North Carolina, Chapel Hill (BA); Columbia University (JD)

Aziz Zahirul Huq is an American legal scholar who is the Frank and Bernice J. Greenberg Professor of Law at the University of Chicago Law School. He is a scholar in the areas of constitutional law, federal courts, and criminal procedure. His work in constitutional law principally focuses on individual rights and liberties under the U.S. Constitution.

== Education ==
Huq graduated from the University of North Carolina at Chapel Hill with a B.A. summa cum laude in 1996, majoring in international studies and French. He was a member of Phi Beta Kappa. In 2001, he graduated with a J.D. summa cum laude from Columbia Law School, where he was awarded the John Ordronaux Prize for achieving the highest academic average in his graduating class. He served as an essay and review editor on the Columbia Law Review.

== Career ==
After graduating from law school, Huq clerked for Judge Robert D. Sack on the U.S. Court of Appeals for the Second Circuit and Justice Ruth Bader Ginsburg on the U.S. Supreme Court. Between 2003 and 2008, he held several positions at the International Crisis Group in Brussels and at the New York University School of Law. He is a counsel at the American Civil Liberties Union.

Huq joined the faculty at the University of Chicago Law School in 2009. In 2016, he was appointed as a tenured professor of law. His research focuses on the interaction of constitutional design with individual rights and liberties. He has co-authored the books Unchecked and Unbalanced: Presidential Power in a Time of Terror (2007), How to Save a Constitutional Democracy (2018) (with his colleague, Tom Ginsburg), and wrote The Collapse of Constitutional Remedies (2021). Huq also regularly writes Op-Eds for Politico, the Washington Post, and other popular outlets. Huq is one of the most cited active scholars of constitutional law in the United States.

== See also ==
- List of law clerks for the sixth seat of the Supreme Court of the United States
