= Daniel Ziblatt =

American political scientist (born 1972)

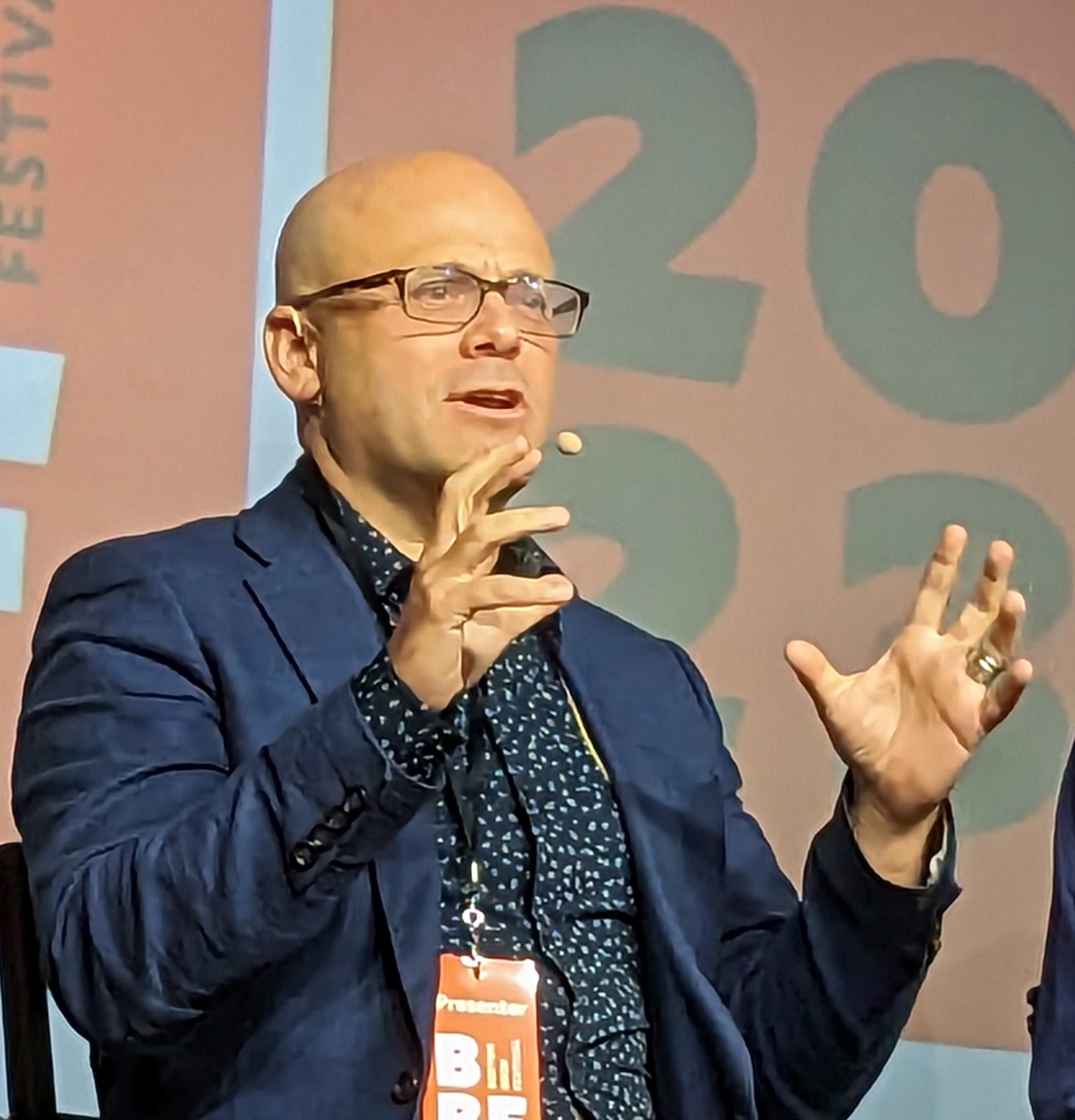
- Ziblatt in 2023
- Born: 1972 (age 53–54)
- Education: Pomona College (BA); University of California, Berkeley (PhD)
- Occupation: Political scientist
- Employer: Harvard University
- Notable work: Conservative Parties and the Birth of Democracy; How Democracies Die

Daniel Ziblatt (born 1972) is an American political scientist who has been Eaton Professor of the Science of Government at Harvard University since 2018. He holds an expertise in democracies, their infrastructural and procedural innerworkings.

== Education ==
Ziblatt holds a BA in German studies and politics from Pomona College and a PhD in political science from UC Berkeley.

== Research ==
In 2018, Ziblatt published How Democracies Die with fellow Harvard scholar Steven Levitsky. The book examines the conditions that can lead democracies to break down from within, rather than due to external events such as military coups or foreign invasions. How Democracies Die received widespread praise. It spent a number of weeks on The New York Times Best Seller list and six weeks on the non-fiction bestseller list of the German weekly Der Spiegel.

The book was recognized as one of the best nonfiction books of 2018 by The Washington Post, Time, and Foreign Affairs.

== Publications ==
=== Books ===
- Tyranny of the Minority: Why American Democracy Reached the Breaking Point, with Steven Levitsky, (Crown, 2023, ISBN 978-0-593-44307-1)
- How Democracies Die, with Steven Levitsky, (Crown, 2018, ISBN 9780525574538) – NDR Kultur Sachbuchpreis 2018; Goldsmith Book Prize 2019
- Conservative Parties and the Birth of Democracy, (Cambridge: Cambridge University Press, 2017, ISBN 9781107001626)
- Structuring the State: The Formation of Italy and Germany and the Puzzle of Federalism, (Princeton: Princeton University Press, 2006, ISBN 9780691121673)
