= NDR Kultur Sachbuchpreis =

German literary award

NDR Kultur Sachbuchpreis is a literary prize of Germany.

- 2010 Diaries by Harry Graf Kessler
- 2020 Invisible Women: Exposing Data Bias in a World Designed for Men
- 2022 Annika Joeres, Susanne Götze, Klima außer Kontrolle
- 2023 Teresa Bücker, Alle_Zeit – Eine Frage von Macht und Freiheit.
