= Social policy of the first Trump administration =

The social policy of the first Donald Trump administration was generally socially conservative. As of 2016, Donald Trump described himself as pro-life with exceptions for rape, incest, and circumstances endangering the life of the mother. He said he was committed to appointing justices who may overturn the ruling in Roe v. Wade. Trump appointed three Supreme Court justices during his presidency. All of them later went on to vote in the majority opinion of Dobbs v. Jackson Women's Health Organization, the Supreme Court case overturning Roe v. Wade and ending federal abortion rights nationwide.

Before his presidency, Trump made contradictory comments on same-sex marriage. Whereas he largely avoided commenting on LGBT issues as a candidate, his administration rolled back numerous LGBT protections. He ordered a ban on all transgender personnel from serving in the military during his presidency. Trump supported a broad interpretation of the Second Amendment and said he was opposed to gun control in general, although his views have shifted over time. Trump also supported removing the federal government from determining the legality of recreational marijuana and supported states that have legalized medical marijuana.

In terms of criminal justice, Trump has stated to be "tough on crime" and for "law and order". He frequently praised law enforcement officers and was critical of the Black Lives Matter movement amid the George Floyd protests, referring to the slogan "Black Lives Matter" as a symbol of hate. He favored capital punishment, as well as the use of waterboarding saying his administration would do "a hell of a lot worse" if he was elected. In 2018, Trump signed the bipartisan First Step Act in law, a bill aimed at reforming federal prisons and sentencing laws.

== Law enforcement and justice ==
=== Capital punishment ===
Trump has long advocated for capital punishment in the United States. In May 1989, shortly after the Central Park jogger case received widespread media attention, Trump purchased a full-page ad in four New York City newspapers with the title "BRING BACK THE DEATH PENALTY!" Five defendants (the "Central Park Five") were wrongfully convicted in the case and were subsequently exonerated. By June 2019, Trump stood by his previous statements about the case, saying "You have people on both sides of that. They admitted their guilt. If you look at Linda Fairstein and if you look at some of the prosecutors, they think that the city should never have settled that case. So we'll leave it at that."

In December 2015, in a speech accepting the endorsement of the New England Police Benevolent Association, Trump said that "One of the first things I do [if elected President] in terms of executive order if I win will be to sign a strong, strong statement that will go out to the country, out to the world, that ... anybody killing a police officer—death penalty. It's going to happen, O.K.?" However, under the current U.S. legal system, these prosecutions usually take place in state court under state law, and the president has no authority over such cases. Furthermore, nineteen states have abolished the death penalty, and mandatory death sentences are unconstitutional, as held by the Supreme Court in Woodson v. North Carolina (1976).

On September 3, 2020, Michael Forest Reinoehl—suspected in the killing of a member of a far-right group in Portland, Oregon a week earlier— initiated a shootout with law enforcement which wanted to arrest him; he was fatally shot. On September 12, Fox News aired an interview in which Trump endorsed the police shooting of Reinoehl. "There has to be retribution when you have a crime like that,” Trump said, referring to the killing of the far-right activist, a crime for which Reinoehl had not been tried. “This guy was a violent criminal, and the U.S. marshals killed him, and I will tell you something, that's the way it has to be."

Under Trump, the American government executed 13 prisoners.

=== First Amendment and defamation law ===
Trump has called for police to arrest those who protest at his rallies, saying that fear of an "arrest mark" that would "ruin the rest of their lives" would be a deterrent and that then "we're not going to have any more protesters, folks." Geoffrey R. Stone, a professor at the University of Chicago Law School, notes that opponents and disruptive individuals may be removed from Trump rallies consistent with the First Amendment, but opponents have a First Amendment right to protest Trump outside the venue. Stone writes that it is unclear whether it would be consistent with the First Amendment for Trump to "order the removal of those who oppose his candidacy from his political rallies if he does not announce in advance that they are open only to his supporters", noting that the answer to this question depends not on the First Amendment, but on the nature of open invitations in the law of trespass.

Trump has said that if elected, he would loosen defamation laws so that when journalists write "purposely negative and horrible and false articles, we can sue them and win lots of money." The Associated Press reported that this proposal to weaken the First Amendment protections for the press is at odds with "widely held conceptions of constitutional law". The Reporters Committee for Freedom of the Press and other First Amendment advocates condemned Trump's proposal, which would make it easier to win lawsuits accusing newspapers of libel.

Trump has expressed support for adopting English-style defamation laws in the U.S.; under UK law, it is easier for plaintiffs to sue newspapers and other media outlets. In 2016, the American Bar Association (ABA)'s committee on media law created a report that was critical of Trump's support for expansive defamation laws and his use of libel suits in the past. The committee concluded that Trump was "a 'libel bully' who had filed many meritless suits attacking his opponents and had never won in court". The ABA's leadership blocked the report from being issued; the organization did not contest the committee's conclusions, but expressed concern about the possibility of being sued by Trump.

On the campaign trail in 2015 and 2016, Trump frequently antagonized the press, referring to the media as "the most dishonest people" and "absolute scum". The Trump campaign has barred reporters (from Politico, The New York Times, The Des Moines Register, The Huffington Post, and Univision, among others) from its campaign events, "often in the wake of critical coverage". In October 2016, NBC News reportedly held off on airing a video of Trump making lewd and disparaging remarks about women due to concerns that Trump would sue the network.

At a rally in June 2020, he said he believed that people who burn the American flag should be jailed for at least a year, though he acknowledged that this would potentially violate "freedom of speech."

=== Privacy, encryption, and electronic surveillance ===
On National Security Agency (NSA) surveillance, Trump says he "tends to err on the side of security" over privacy. Trump supports bringing back now-expired provisions of the Patriot Act to allow for the NSA to collect and store bulk telephone metadata. Trump said: "I assume that when I pick up my telephone, people are listening to my conversations anyway."

In February 2016, Trump urged his supporters to boycott Apple Inc. unless the company agrees to build a custom backdoor for the FBI to unlock the password-protected iPhone connected to one of the perpetrators of the 2015 San Bernardino shooting, a move that Apple argues would threaten the security and privacy of its users. Trump himself still used his iPhone to send out tweets. In April 2017, Trump signed a bill that repealed a rule for internet service providers to get a user's consent to sell their information. In May 2020, Trump reversed his stance, stating that "warrantless surveillance of Americans is wrong", and threatening to veto reauthorization of the Foreign Intelligence Surveillance Act.

=== Rights of the accused ===
In a 1989 interview with Larry King Trump said, "The problem with our society is the victim has absolutely no rights and the criminal has unbelievable rights" and that "maybe hate is what we need if we're gonna get something done." In 2016, Trump decried the fact that Ahmad Khan Rahami, a U.S. citizen charged in connection with the bombings in New York and New Jersey, would be provided with medical treatment and the right to counsel, calling this "sad".

At the second presidential debate, which took place in October 2016, Trump said that if he was "in charge of the law of our country", rival presidential contender Hillary Clinton would "be in jail". In the same debate, Trump also pledged that if elected he would direct his attorney general to appoint a special prosecutor to "look into" Clinton. Clinton campaign manager Robby Mook called the remark "chilling" and said: "Trump thinks that the presidency is like some banana republic dictatorship where you can lock up your political opponents." The remark was viewed as part of "a litany of statements [Trump] has made during the campaign that many legal specialists have portrayed as a threat to the rule of law". The remark was condemned by a number of prominent Republican lawyers, such as Paul K. Charlton, Marc Jimenez, and Peter Zeidenberg, as well as David B. Rivkin and Michael Chertoff. Trump campaign manager Kellyanne Conway said the "jail" comment was merely "a quip".

Later that October, Trump spoke fondly of the "lock her up" chants at his rally, saying "Lock her up is right." He also said Clinton's legal representatives "have to go to jail". However, in November, after winning the election, Trump told reporters from the New York Times he would not recommend prosecution of Clinton, saying it was "just not something [he] feel[s] very strongly about" and suggesting that Clinton had "suffered greatly". He repeated this stance in public at a rally in Michigan the following month, responding to "Lock her up" chants from the crowd by saying: "That plays great before the election—now we don't care, right?"

==== Trying U.S. citizens in military tribunals ====
In August 2016, Trump expressed support for trying U.S. citizens accused of terrorism in military tribunals at the Guantanamo Bay Naval Base at Guantánamo Bay, Cuba. Under current federal law (specifically, the Military Commissions Act of 2006), trying U.S. citizens at military commissions is illegal; only "alien unlawful enemy combatants" may be tried in such commissions.

==== Use of torture to procure information ====
In February 2016, Trump said he approved of the use of waterboarding and "a hell of a lot worse". He said that "torture works" and called waterboarding a "minor form" of torture. Speaking with Sean Hannity on Fox News on January 26, 2017, Trump termed waterboarding "just short of torture". He also said he would rely on the advice of his defense secretary, James Mattis and others and, "If they don't wanna do, that's fine. If they do wanna do, then I will work for that end."

=== Voter fraud ===
Trump opposes same-day voter registration, supports voter identification laws, has asserted that Obama won in 2012 due to voter fraud, has charged that the election system would be rigged against him in the 2016 race, and has equivocated on whether he would accept the outcome of the 2016 election.

Trump has asserted that America's "voting system is out of control", alleging that "you have people, in my opinion, that are voting many, many times," even though the number of cases of voter fraud in the U.S. is minuscule. Trump opposes same-day voter registration, alleging that this allows non-citizens to vote in U.S. elections and that voting laws should prevent people from "[sneaking] in through the cracks". PolitiFact ruled Trump's claim about voter fraud false, noting that according to experts, "there is no additional risk of noncitizens casting ballots in states with same-day voter registration, nor is there any evidence that this occurs."

While he has repeatedly charged during his candidacy that the election system is rigged against him, Trump's statements became bolder and more specific in August 2016. He alleged that he would lose Pennsylvania only if "cheating goes on", and that voters will cast their ballots "15 times" for Clinton without voter ID laws. The Wall Street Journal noted that several voter ID laws have been struck down in several states recently, with courts ruling that they unfairly discriminate against minority voters, and that "there is no evidence of widespread voter fraud occurring in recent U.S. elections." According to Dartmouth political scientist Brendan Nyhan, Trump's rhetoric "threatens the norms of American elections and could provoke a damaging reaction among his supporters".

In the September 2016 presidential debate, when asked if he would honor the outcome of the election, Trump said he "absolutely" would. Four days later, Trump appeared to have reconsidered his statement from the debate, saying "We're going to have to see. We're going to see what happens. We're going to have to see." In early- and mid-October 2016, Trump repeatedly claimed the election was "rigged" and alleged that the media coordinated with the Clinton campaign, citing Alec Baldwin's portrayal of him on Saturday Night Live. In October 2016, after early voting and voting by mail had begun in many states, Trump claimed, without evidence, that the election was being rigged "at many polling places". That same month, Trump asserted, also without evidence, that the federal government was allowing illegal immigrants to come into the U.S. so they can vote. PolitiFact found Trump's claim of "large scale voter fraud" false, giving it a "Pants-on-fire" rating.

Trump has claimed that "dead people voted for President Obama" and that "dead voters ... helped get President Obama elected." and alleged that voting machines were "switching" votes for the Republican nominee, Mitt Romney, to votes for Obama. On election night 2012, Trump expressed skepticism about Obama's victory, saying, among other things, "This election is a total sham and a travesty. We are not a democracy!" Additionally, when it seemed like Mitt Romney may have gained the popular vote but lost the electoral college vote, Trump called the electoral college system "a disaster for democracy", calling for "a revolution in this country".

Since his election in November 2016—in which he won the electoral college but received 2.8 million fewer votes nationally than Clinton—Trump has repeatedly insisted, without evidence, that he actually won the popular vote if one excludes "three to five million illegal votes" cast for his opponent. This claim is false. After taking office, Trump said he would launch a major investigation into these unsubstantiated allegations, and appointing his vice president, Mike Pence, to head a White House commission to do so. Trump eventually followed through with that promise, announcing the creation of a commission to investigate voter fraud via an executive order on May 11, 2017. On June 29, 2017, the vice-chairman of Trump's voter fraud commission, former Kansas Secretary of State Kris Kobach, instructed the secretaries of state for all 50 states to provide the commission with voter roll data, though most refused to provide some voter information, citing concerns of privacy. This prompted President Trump to remark on Twitter, "Numerous states are refusing to give information to the very distinguished VOTER FRAUD PANEL. What are they trying to hide?".

== Health ==
=== Funding for health agencies and programs ===
==== Pandemic preparedness ====
In May 2018, John Bolton disbanded the National Security Council's office for pandemic preparation.

In January 2020, U.S. intelligence agencies began issuing classified warnings to the Trump administration and to Congress that the novel coronavirus would likely become a pandemic. An anonymous official said: "They just couldn't get him to do anything about it." Amid the coronavirus pandemic, at a press conference on February 26, Trump said that the number of cases "within a couple of days is going to be down to close to zero". At that same event, however, Trump implied that the government was assembling a response team. In response to a reporter's question about whether he regretted cuts to the Centers for Disease Control and Prevention (CDC)—during his first two years in office, the CDC workforce had shrunk by five percent—Trump responded: "Some of the people we cut, they haven't been used for many, many years ... I'm a business person; I don't like having thousands of people around when you don't need them. When we need them, we can get them back very quickly. For instance, we're bringing some people in tomorrow that are already in this great government that we have, and very specifically for this."

==== Other health programs ====
Trump's proposed 2021 budget includes a $1.9 trillion cut to anticipated future health care spending over the next ten years, including a $920 billion cut to Medicaid and a $451 billion cut to Medicare. The Republicans' idea is to reduce these programs' anticipated annual growth from 5.4 percent to 3.1 percent.

Trump's proposed 2021 budget would cut 19 percent of the overall CDC budget compared to the previous year.

==== Embryonic stem-cell and fetal tissue research ====
In 2016, The Atlantic asked President-elect Trump his position on embryonic stem-cell research, but his team did not respond with a comment. Trump had not taken a public position on the issue. President Trump selected Dr. Francis Collins, who supports federally funded embryonic stem-cell research, to continue serving as director of the National Institutes of Health. The Trump administration, as of January 19, 2018, and as of September 4, 2020, had not cut funding to embryonic stem-cell research.

In June 2019, the Trump administration banned federal government scientists from using fetal tissue in research, but the ban does not apply to privately funded research. The Trump administration approved new restrictions on federal funding for grants for research by private researchers, but did not ban the research on fetal tissue completely. The Washington Post reported that the new requirements to qualify for federal grants involving research with fetal tissue are difficult to meet. Private funding for research is unaffected.

=== Illegal drugs ===
Trump's views on drug policy have shifted dramatically over time. At a luncheon hosted by the Miami Herald in April 1990, Trump told a crowd of 700 people that U.S. drug enforcement policy was "a joke", and that: "We're losing badly the war on drugs. You have to legalize drugs to win that war. You have to take the profit away from these drug czars." In his campaign for the presidency in 2015 and 2016, however, Trump adopted "drug warrior" positions and sought advice from William J. Bennett, who served as the U.S. first "drug czar" in the 1980s and as Christopher Ingraham of the Washington Post suggests, he "remains a proponent of harsh 1980s-style drug war tactics".

Trump stated at CPAC in June 2015 that he "feel[s] strongly" opposed to marijuana legalization. However, when asked about Colorado (where recreational use of marijuana is legal), Trump softened his previously expressed views and essentially said that states should be able to legalize recreational marijuana.

Trump claims to have never personally used controlled substances.

=== Medical marijuana ===
Trump has voiced support for medical marijuana, saying he is "a hundred percent in favor" because "I know people that have serious problems ... and ... it really, really does help them."

=== Workplace Standards ===
On March 27, 2017, Trump signed a bill that revoked an executive order from the Obama administration that required federal contractors to disclose labor violations. On April 4, 2017, Trump signed a bill revoking a rule that required workplaces to track injuries.

== Religion ==
=== Christianity ===
Trump, a previously self-described Presbyterian who was described by CNN as "unique among modern American presidents for his seeming lack of deep religious orientation", has considered the support of evangelical voters as instrumental to his election. In the 2016 election, 81 percent of white evangelicals voted for him. In 2020, Trump said that he no longer identifies as Presbyterian and now identifies as a nondenominational Christian.

Trump attended Marble Collegiate Church, a congregation of the Reformed Church in America and United Church of Christ, for more than 50 years. In 2015, the church announced that he was not an "active member", and Trump acknowledged that he hadn't attended in several years. In a 2011 interview, after Sean Hannity asked, "How important is your faith?" Trump replied, "Very important," but he added, "I'm also busy." Trump's third marriage, to Melania Knauss, was performed at Bethesda-by-the-Sea Episcopal Church in 2005.

He has vowed to end the Johnson Amendment, an IRS rule that prohibits section 501(c) tax-exempt organizations from endorsing candidates or participating in partisan campaigns. He said the rule undermines Christian influence in U.S. politics, adding "we have more Christians than we have men or women in our country and we don't have a lobby because they're afraid to have a lobby because they don't want to lose their tax status ... So I am going to work like hell to get rid of that prohibition and we're going to have the strongest Christian lobby and it's going to happen." In his February 2017 address at the National Prayer Breakfast Trump said, "I will get rid of and totally destroy the Johnson Amendment."

Trump claims that there is discrimination against American Christians. He suggested that the IRS has targeted him for audit because he is "a strong Christian". Trump has also lent his voice to the claim—originally promulgated in the United States through Fox News commentator Bill O'Reilly in the early 2000s—that there is a "War on Christmas" led by department stores that do not use the name of the holiday, which he spoke to during his election campaign. Less than nine months after taking office, in the month of October, he declared that "We're saying 'Merry Christmas' again." During his campaign Trump also declared that "Christianity is under tremendous siege" and suggested that he would have an easier time banning Christian immigrants than Muslim ones.

=== Muslims ===
On November 19, 2015, a week after the November 2015 Paris attacks, when asked if he would implement a database system to track Muslims in the United States, Trump said: "I would certainly implement that. Absolutely. There should be a lot of systems, beyond databases. We should have a lot of systems." On November 21, Trump clarified that he does not support any registry of Muslims and that his earlier supportive remarks for surveilling them were due to efforts by news media to entrap him. However, he said he would order "surveillance of certain mosques" to combat "Islamic extremism", alluding to the New York Police Department's use of informants in mosques after the September 11 attacks. Trump also spoke in favor of a database on Syrian refugees without clarifying how it would be different from the records already kept by federal agencies.

Trump's support for a database of American Muslims "drew sharp rebukes from his Republican presidential rivals and disbelief from legal experts". Trump justified his proposals by repeatedly and falsely saying he recalled "thousands and thousands of people ... cheering" in Jersey City, New Jersey, when the World Trade Center towers fell. PolitiFact noted that this statement was false and gave it a "Pants on Fire" rating. It reported that the rating was based on some debunked rumors and also that there were only eight people (suggested by unproven media reports) purported to be seen cheering, as opposed to Trump's claim of "thousands and thousands". Jersey City Mayor Steve Fulop called Trump's false claim "absurd" and said Trump "has memory issues or willfully distorts the truth".

==== Travel ban ====
In April 2017, Trump was accused of being Islamophobic while presenting Executive Order 13769, which blocked people from seven Muslim-majority countries from entering the United States.

The Trump travel ban denotes a series of executive actions which restricted entry of travellers from select countries. Executive Order 13769 sought to restrict travel from seven countries: Iran, Iraq, Libya, Somalia, Sudan, Syria, and Yemen. Executive Order 13780 removed Iraq from the list of targeted countries and allowed more exemptions. Then on September 24, Presidential Proclamation 9645 aimed at more permanently establishing travel restrictions on those countries except Sudan, while adding North Korea and Venezuela which had not previously been included.

Critics described the order as a "Muslim ban" for targeting Muslim-majority countries and prioritizing minority-religion refugees. President Trump, however, stated that, "this is not a Muslim ban, as the media is falsely reporting," while Rudy Giuliani, who said he helped write the order, called it a legal alternative to a religious ban targeting Muslims.

== Race relations ==
=== African Americans ===
Speaking to Fox News host Bill O'Reilly during his 2016 presidential campaign, Trump said he could relate to the systemic bias African Americans faced against whites, saying, "even against me the system is rigged when I ran ... for president". When asked if he could understand the experience of being African American, Trump replied, "I would like to say yes, but you really can't unless you are African American. You can't truly understand what's going on unless you are African American. I would like to say yes, however." When asked if he believes there to be a racial divide in America, Trump answered, "Sadly, there would seem to be ... and it's probably not been much worse at any time."

When he was asked if he believes police treat African Americans differently than whites, Trump answered, "It could be." Trump described the police killings of Alton Sterling and Philando Castile as "tough to watch" and criticized the "terrible, disgusting performance" by police. Trump has criticized the Black Lives Matter movement and accused former President Obama of "dividing America". Trump said he may direct his Attorney General to look into the Black Lives Matter movement for criminal charges.

In September 2020, Trump directed federal government agencies to discontinue anti-bias and racial sensitivity training for its employees. Office of Management and Budget Director Russell Vought said in a memo, Trump instructed him to cancel funding for what it calls "divisive, anti-American propaganda". Federal agencies were instructed to "begin to identify all contracts or other agency spending related to any training on 'critical race theory,' 'white privilege,' or any other training or propaganda effort that teaches or suggests either (1) that the United States is an inherently racist or evil country or (2) that any race or ethnicity is inherently racist or evil." Conservative media had criticized critical race theory shortly before the memo was published. Afterward, Trump posted on Twitter that critical race theory was "a sickness that cannot be allowed to continue." He also posted on Twitter, "Not any more!" in response to a comment that "critical race theory is the greatest threat to western civilization and it's made its way into the US federal government."

=== White supremacy ===
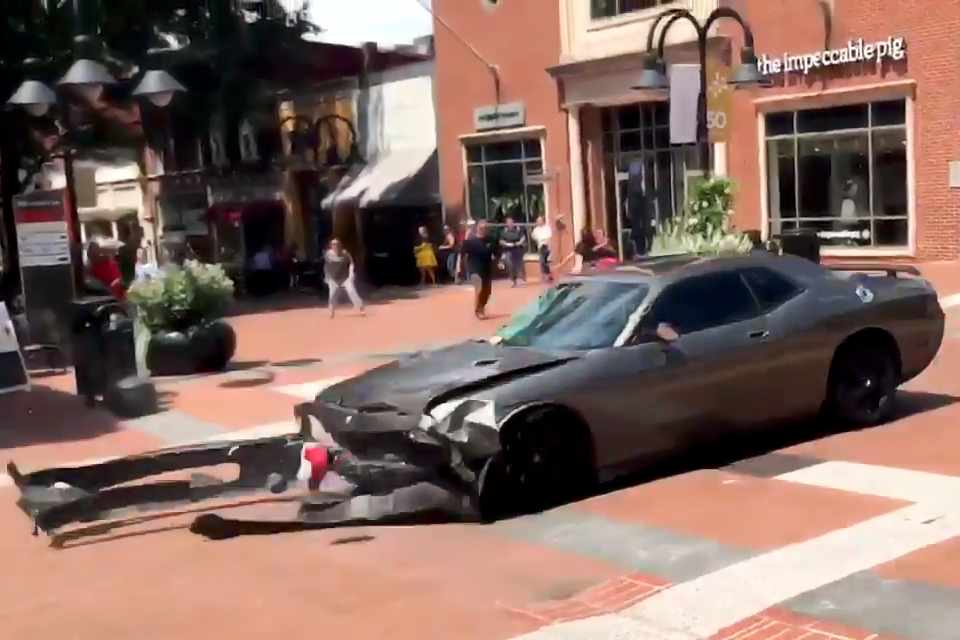
Car that rammed protesters and killed a woman in Charlottesville, Virginia, August 2017

In June 2017, the Department of Homeland Security dropped a planned 400,000 dollar grant to "Life After Hate", a program which was intended to de-radicalize Neo-Nazis and stop white extremism. The change came following a review of priorities, begun during the Obama administration, with regards to a 10 million dollar DHS umbrella grant program for "Countering Violent Extremism".

In August 2017, Trump condemned violence "on many sides" after a car plowed into counter-protesters during a gathering of hundreds of white nationalists in Charlottesville, Virginia the previous day, on August 12. Trump did not expressly mention Neo-Nazis, white supremacists, the alt-right movement, or counter protesters in his remarks. Whereas Republican and Democratic elected officials condemned the violence and hatred of white nationalists, neo-Nazis and alt-right activists, The New York Times noted that Trump was the only national political figure to spread blame for the "hatred, bigotry and violence" that resulted in a death to "many sides". Two days later, Trump condemned "the KKK, neo-Nazis, white supremacists, and other hate groups". Then the next day, he returned to his initial comments, blaming "both sides". Trump came under criticism from world leaders and politicians, as well as a variety of religious groups and anti-hate organizations for his remarks, which were seen as muted and equivocal.

=== Native American relations ===
On March 27, 2020, the Department of the Interior revoked the status of the Mashpee Wampanoag tribe, removing its 321-acre Massachusetts reservation from federal trust. The reservation had been placed into federal trust in 2015.

The Mashpee Wampanoag people had proposed running a casino. This casino would have competed for business with two casinos in Rhode Island that have ties to Trump. Those two casinos are owned by Twin River Worldwide Holdings. George Papanier, formerly a finance executive for the Trump Plaza casino hotel in Atlantic City, is Twin River's president. Matt Schlapp, chairman of the Conservative Political Action Committee (and husband of White House strategic communications director Mercedes Schlapp), is a lobbyist for Twin River casinos. In 2019, Trump had opposed legislation to protect the Mashpee Wampanoag land; he called it a "special interest casino bill".

== Women's rights ==
=== Abortion ===
==== Before 2016 ====
Trump's views on abortion have changed significantly.

In 1999, Trump described himself as "very pro-choice" and said "I believe in choice." Although he said he hated the "concept of abortion," he said he would not ban it, nor the specific procedure sometimes called "partial-birth abortion". That year, he gave interviews describing himself as "totally pro-choice" and claiming that abortion should be "removed from politics. I believe it is a personal decision that should be left to the women and their doctors."

In his 2016 presidential campaign, by contrast, he described himself as "pro-life" (more specifically as "pro-life with exceptions"); suggested that women who have abortions should face some sort of punishment (a view he quickly retracted); and pledged to appoint pro-life justices to the Supreme Court.

==== 2016 presidential campaign ====
While campaigning for the presidency in 2016 Trump said, "I'm pro-life and I've been pro-life a long time" and acknowledged that he had "evolved" on the issue. CNN reported that Trump "dodged questions testing the specificity of those views". In August 2015, Trump said he supported a government shutdown over federal funding for Planned Parenthood (which receives federal funding for the health services it provides to 2.7 million people annually, but is barred by federal law from using federal funds for abortion-related procedures). In March 2016, Trump said Planned Parenthood should not be funded "as long as you have the abortion going on", but he acknowledged that "Planned Parenthood has done very good work for many, many—for millions of women." Planned Parenthood said the "Trump presidency would be a disaster for women" and criticized Trump's claim that he would "be great for women while in the same breath pledging to block them from accessing care at Planned Parenthood."

In an interview later that month, Trump acknowledged that there must be "some form" of punishment for women if abortion were made illegal in the U.S. He issued a statement later that day reversing his position from earlier by saying, "the doctor or any other person performing this illegal act upon a woman would be held legally responsible, not the woman." Trump has said that abortion should be legal in cases involving "rape, incest or the life of the mother being at risk". In April 2016, he said that "it would have been better if [abortion rights] were up to the states."

In May 2016, when asked if he would appoint Supreme Court justices who would overturn Roe v. Wade, Trump said: "Well, they'll be pro-life. And we'll see about overturning, but I will appoint judges that will be pro-life." In the same interview he said of the pro-life movement, "I will protect it, and the biggest way you can protect is through the Supreme Court." The Susan B. Anthony List, a pro-life feminist group, praised Trump's list of potential Supreme Court nominees as "exceptionally strong", while the pro-abortion rights group NARAL Pro-Choice America called the candidates on the list "a woman's worst nightmare". Trump has also pledged to sign legislation from Congress banning abortion at the 20-week mark.

==== Presidency ====
In his first interview following his designation as president-elect, Trump affirmed his pledge to appoint pro-life Supreme Court justices. He said that if Roe v. Wade were overturned, the issue would be returned to the states, and that if some states outlawed abortion, a woman would "have to go to another state" to get one.

On January 24, days after being sworn in, Trump issued an executive order reinstating the Mexico City policy (also called the "global gag rule"). Under the policy, international non-governmental organizations that "offer or promote abortions as part of their family planning services" are barred from receiving funds from the U.S. Agency for International Development (USAID).

In January 2018, Trump spoke at the March for Life in Washington, D.C., becoming the first president to directly address the annual pro-life rally, albeit through satellite.

On May 3, 2018, he signed an executive order entitled, "Establishment of a White House Faith and Opportunity Initiative" that aims to prevent funding for abortion.

On several occasions Trump has asserted that Democrats advocate "executing" newborn babies. In February 2019 he tweeted, "The Democrat position on abortion is now so extreme that they don't mind executing babies AFTER birth ..." The assertion became a staple at his rallies, including in April 2019 when he said, "The baby is born. The mother meets with the doctor. They take care of the baby. They wrap the baby beautifully. And then the doctor and the mother determine whether or not they will execute the baby."

In June 2019, the Trump administration was allowed by a federal court of appeals to implement, while legal appeals continue, a policy restricting taxpayer dollars given to family planning facilities through Title X. The policy requires that companies receiving Title X funding must not mention abortion to patients, provide abortion referrals, or share space with abortion providers. As a result, Planned Parenthood, which provides Title X birth control services to 1.5 million women, is withdrawing from the program.

During the 2020 campaign, Trump claimed that Roe was not, as he had previously claimed, necessarily going to be reversed as a result of his judicial appointments; during a debate with then-candidate Joe Biden, Trump responded, "Why is [Roe] on the ballot? It's not on the ballot...There's nothing happening there.” He had previously said that the decision would be "automatically" overturned as a result of his judicial appointments.

==== 2024 presidential campaign ====
In September, 2023, Trump announced that he was opposed to state-level bans on abortion after six weeks of pregnancy, specifically criticizing Ron DeSantis for signing legislation banning abortion after six weeks of pregnancy in Florida. He further said that he would not sign a federal ban on abortion after 15 weeks of pregnancy if elected president. However, Trump did support banning abortion later in the pregnancy using a yet-to-be determined standard, based on weeks or months of pregnancy, though he declined to say whether this would be a federal or state-based ban, and continued to refer to himself as "the most pro-life" president in US history. In 2024, The New York Times reported that Trump had told supporters that he would support banning abortion after 16 weeks of pregnancy. Following the report, the Trump campaign denied that Trump had said he supported banning abortion after 16 weeks, calling the report "fake news." On March 20, 2024, Trump said he would be open to supporting a federal ban on abortion after 15 weeks of pregnancy, but he said he preferred abortion to remain a state issue. On April 10, 2024, Trump reversed his consideration of a national ban, saying he would not sign a federal abortion ban. Asked about the Arizona Supreme Court's ruling in favor of enforcing an 1864 territorial law banning abortion in all cases except to save the pregnant woman's life, he said that he disagreed with the state law, that "it goes too far," and that he hoped the state legislature would amend the law. Two days later, however, on April 12, 2024, Trump said a federal abortion ban was no longer necessary "because we broke Roe v. Wade" and that "it's working [at the state level] the way it's supposed to." Trump said he had "strong views" about access to Mifepristone, sometimes called the "abortion pill," but did not elaborate, and his campaign released a statement saying that Trump considers the issue to be settled after a Supreme Court ruling rejecting challenges to the drug. However, later, Trump appeared to reverse that position and said he was open to restricting the abortion pill federally, allowing the states to restrict access to Mifepristone.

In April 2024, his campaign positions on abortion were described by NBC News and CNN as shifting and "conflicting", while Fox News described his reactions as "a pattern of apprehension." At the end of August, he “changed his position four times on abortion in ... 48 hours,” Representative Adam Schiff observed.

=== Birth control and family planning ===
On May 21, 2024, Trump said that he would support states being able to make their own decisions on whether or not to ban Emergency Contraception, commonly called the morning-after pill, and other forms of contraception. Asked about birth control, including the morning-after pill, Trump said “You know, things really do have a lot to do with the states, and some states are going to have different policy than others...." Following backlash to his statement about states being able to ban forms of contraception, Trump quickly retracted his statement saying on social media that he would "never advocate imposing restrictions on birth control."

=== Family leave ===
In October 2015, Trump was cautious regarding paid family leave, as he thought it may adversely impact the country's competitiveness. In September 2016, he announced a policy proposal created in part by his daughter Ivanka, to guarantee six weeks of paid maternity leave to mothers who do not already receive similar benefits from their employers. This policy was the first paid maternity leave plan from a Republican presidential nominee. Trump's proposals were criticized by opponents as hypocritical in light of Trump's previous comments on women, and for being sexist in assuming that women were their children's sole caregivers. Josh Levs in Time magazine wrote that "Policies that only allow women time off end up hurting women by pushing women to stay home and men to stay at work, reinforcing our anachronistic Mad Men-era work cultures."

In 2019 Trump signed the National Defense Authorization Act for Fiscal Year 2020 which contained an amendment guaranteeing 12 weeks of parental leave for most federal employees occurring on or after October 1, 2020. In a letter released after signing the bill Trump endorsed the provision.

During the 2020 State of the Union Address, Trump became the first Republican president to express support for paid family leave and signaled support for a bipartisan Child tax credit bill.

=== In-vitro fertilization ===
In February, 2024, the Alabama Supreme Court ruled that embryos are children under state law and, therefore, fertility clinics were liable for their loss as if they were born children. The ruling by Alabama's Supreme Court was able to take effect as a result of the Dobbs decision in which the US Supreme Court overturned Roe v. Wade; Donald Trump appointed three of the five justices who voted to completely overturn Roe. Following the decision in Alabama, Trump opposed the ruling and said he supports access to IVF and fertility treatments.

=== Women in the military ===
On May 7, 2013, Trump questioned the wisdom of allowing women to serve in the military, linking gender-integrated forces with higher rates of sexual assault, stating, "26,000 unreported sexual assaults in the military-only 238 convictions. What did these geniuses expect when they put men & women together?" In 2014, Trump said it was "bedlam" to bring women into the army, later shifting his opinion in August 2015, expressing support for women in combat roles.

=== Women in the workplace ===
According to the Chicago Tribune, Trump did not address the gender pay gap in his 2016 presidential bid. According to the Tribune, "Trump's past statements on women in the workplace have included calling pregnancy 'an inconvenience' and telling a voter in New Hampshire last year that women will receive the same pay as men 'if they do as good a job'."

By executive order, Trump rescinded the entire 2014 Fair Pay and Safe Workplaces order that had protected women in the workplace.

In August 2017, the Office of Management and Budget under the Trump administration announced that it would end a requirement for companies to collect data about wage gaps. Companies with over 100 employees had been required to collect wage data by gender, race, and ethnicity. The Obama administration had proposed the data collection in 2014 to support the Lilly Ledbetter Fair Pay Act, and the new data collection rule had taken effect in 2016.

== LGBTQ rights ==
=== Before and during presidential candidacy ===
Before launching a campaign, and while considering a run for the Presidency in the GOP primary, Donald Trump was invited in 2011 by GOProud, a PAC for LGBT conservatives, to speak at the Conservative Political Action Conference (CPAC) and he accepted the invitation, making this his first time speaking at CPAC. During his presidential campaign, Trump largely avoided and did not emphasize issues related to the LGBT community and their rights, and, when asked, he often gave ambiguous answers. As a result of this communications strategy, he was often viewed as having a relatively tolerant view of LGBT people compared to other Republican candidates. Rea Carey, the executive director of the National LGBTQ Task Force, described his public statements on LGBT issues during the campaign as "confusing and conflicting".

==== Orlando nightclub shooting ====
On June 13, 2016, Trump gave a speech framed around the threat of "radical Islamic terrorists," referring to a recent mass shooting at Pulse, a gay nightclub in Orlando. He asked rhetorically who LGBT people could count on as a "friend": "Donald Trump with actions or Hillary Clinton with her words?" "Terrorists," he said, "murder gays. I don't want them in our country." He said that Democratic policies like those of his rival, Clinton, would "bring people in in vast numbers who reject our values." His speech did not propose any domestic policy that would directly help LGBT people.

Although he was the first Republican presidential nominee to use the term "LGBTQ" in his acceptance speech at the July 2016 Republican National Convention, this was, again, in the context of mentioning the Orlando shooting; his comment opposed "the violence and oppression of the hateful foreign ideology" perpetrated by this "Islamic terrorist." Though he promised to "protect our LGBTQ citizens" from this ideological threat, he did not elaborate on any specific challenges faced by LGBTQ people nor did he describe specifically what he would do to support their safety. Consequently, many observed that this comment primarily served to demonize Islam rather than to endorse or meaningfully support LGBT rights.

==== Pride flag photo op ====
Nine days before the 2016 US presidential election, at a campaign rally in Greeley, Colorado, an audience member presented Trump with a rainbow flag with the handwritten message, "LGBT for Trump". Trump held it onstage for a photo opportunity and then handed the flag back to the audience member.

==== Public comments on LGBT discrimination ====
In an October 1999 appearance on Meet the Press, Trump said gays openly serving in the military was "not something that would disturb me".

In a February 2000 interview with The Advocate, in response to the murders of Matthew Shepard and James Byrd, Trump said he wanted a more "tolerant society". He agreed with amending the Civil Rights Act of 1964 for non-discrimination on the basis of sexual orientation, and would "absolutely" support hate crime legislation covering race, ethnicity, and sexual orientation, notably the Matthew Shepard Act.

Trump has offered qualified support for the First Amendment Defense Act, which aims to protect those who oppose same-sex marriage based on their religious beliefs from action by the federal government, such as revocation of tax-exempt status, grants, loans, benefits, or employment. Trump said, "If Congress considers the First Amendment Defense Act a priority, then I will do all I can to make sure it comes to my desk for signatures and enactment."

==== Same-sex marriage ====
In 2000, Trump stated his belief that "marriage is between a man and a woman." Despite this, as a candidate running in the Reform Party in 1999–2000, Trump included support for civil unions in his campaign platform. Trump congratulated singer Elton John on his civil partnership to his same-sex partner in 2005, writing, "It's a marriage that's going to work ... If two people dig each other, they dig each other." Trump did not indicate whether he had changed his political position on marriage or civil unions.

In early 2011, Trump told Greta Van Susteren on Fox News, "I'm probably as conservative as anybody on your show ... I'm Republican, a very conservative Republican ... I'm not in favor of gay marriage." A month later, when asked by the Des Moines Register if gay couples should receive the same benefits as married couples, he said his "attitude on it has not been fully formed" but then responded simply "no."

At the beginning of his 2016 presidential campaign, Trump continued to oppose same-sex marriage. In June 2015, when asked about the Obergefell v. Hodges ruling in which the Supreme Court guaranteed the right to same-sex marriage nationwide, he said he personally supported "traditional marriage". He added: "I would have preferred states, you know, making the decision...But they [the Supreme Court] made the decision ... So, at a certain point you have to be realistic about it."

In January 2016, when asked about the landmark Supreme Court ruling in Obergefell v. Hodges which had legalized same-sex marriage nationwide, Trump said he would "strongly consider" appointing conservative Supreme Court justices who would overturn the ruling, arguing that it was a matter that should be left for states to decide instead. The Advocate, an American LGBT-interest magazine, characterized Trump's proposed Supreme Court nominees as "LGBT-unfriendly", noting that "not all have ruled in LGBT rights cases, but those who have are largely unsympathetic, and some have the backing of anti-LGBT activists." A month before the election, Trump wrote to the president of CatholicVote.org to express support for legislation that would protect the religious liberty of Christians who oppose same-sex marriage.

However, in November 2016, a few days after he was elected president, Trump suggested that he did not, after all, plan to nominate justices who would overturn the Obergefell ruling. He told Lesley Stahl on 60 Minutes his personal view on same-sex marriage was "irrelevant," that he was "fine with" same-sex marriage, and that the Obergefell decision had "settled" the matter

In 2019, his counselor and spokeswoman Kellyanne Conway said that he approves of same-sex marriage.

For the 2020 presidential election, the Republican Party did not write a new platform, saying only that they would support Trump's reelection. The existing platform from 2016 had opposed same-sex marriage. On Trump's campaign website, the campaign included a page for "Trump Pride," claiming that Donald Trump decided "to openly support the LGBT community." The "Trump Pride" coalition of the 2020 campaign also stated that Trump supports same-sex marriage. This campaign coalition and its claims were met with criticism by some LGBTQ advocacy and activist groups pointing out that the Trump administration banned trans people from the military and rescinded healthcare protections for LGBTQ patients.

For the 2024 presidential election, the Republican Party wrote a new platform that removed language that supported opposition to same-sex marriage.

==== Transgender rights ====
In 2012, prior to running for the presidency, Trump called for the exclusion of trans women from beauty pageants. He did not want Jenna Talackova to compete in the Miss USA pageants. However, Trump eventually overruled the rejection of Jenna Talackova, a transgender contestant for Miss Universe, allowing the transgender contestant to participate in the Miss Universe pageant, and he praised other contestants for supporting the inclusion of transgender women.

At a rally in October 2016, Trump called the open military service of transgender Americans a result of a "political correct military". He said he would seek new recommendations from military leaders on the topic of transgender personnel and would "very strongly" defer to those recommendations.

In April 2016, Trump criticized North Carolina's North Carolina House Bill 2, which eliminated all private employment and public accommodation anti-discrimination laws that were stricter than statewide law and required that, in government buildings, individuals may use only restrooms and changing facilities that correspond to the sex on their birth certificates. The bill was controversial because it prevented transgender people who do not or cannot alter their birth certificates from using the restroom consistent with their gender identity.

Trump said: "North Carolina did something that was very strong and they're paying a big price. ... You leave it the way it is. There have been very few complaints the way it is. People go, they use the bathroom they feel is appropriate, there has been so little trouble, and the problem with what happened in North Carolina is the strife, and the economic punishment that they're taking." He also said: "I fully understand if they [North Carolina] want to go through, but they are losing business and they are having a lot of people come out against."

Later that month, however, Trump expressed the opposite position that states have the right to enact such legislation and that the federal government should not become involved. He did not express an opinion on whether the law was right or wrong.

In July 2016, Trump again emphasized a states' rights approach regarding HB2, saying, "The state, they know what's going on, they see what's happening and generally speaking I'm with the state on things like this. I've spoken with your governor, I've spoken with a lot of people and I'm going with the state."

=== Presidency ===
"Minutes after Donald Trump was sworn into office," GLAAD says, "any mention of the LGBTQ community was erased from White House, Department of State, and Department of Labor websites." He went on to roll back a number of protections for LGBT individuals, such as those for transgender schoolchildren and transgender members of the military. GLAAD identified 195 anti-LGBT political attacks made by the Trump administration.

==== LGBT anti-discrimination laws ====
On January 30, 2017, Donald Trump said he would keep in place a 2014 executive order from the Obama administration which created federal workplace protections for LGBT people. The White House released a statement saying the President was "respectful and supportive of LGBTQ rights" and noted that he was the first Republican nominee to raise the issue (in his acceptance speech at the 2016 Republican National Convention).

However, in March 2017, the Trump administration rolled back key components of the Obama administration's workplace protections for LGBT people. The Trump administration rescinded requirements that federal contractors prove they are complying with the LGBT workplace protections, which makes it difficult to tell if a contractor had refrained from discriminatory practices against LGBT individuals. LGBT advocates have argued that this is a signal that the Trump administration would not enforce workplace violations against LGBT people.

On July 26, 2017, the Department of Justice argued in court that federal civil rights law does not ban employers from discriminating against employees based on sexual orientation. The Obama administration had decided that it did. In March 2017, the Trump administration rolled back efforts to collect data on LGBT Americans. The Health and Human Services removed a question about sexual orientation in a survey of the elderly. The U.S. Census Bureau, which had planned to ask about sexual orientation and gender identity in the 2020 Census and the American Community Survey, scrapped those plans in March 2017.

In 2019, the Trump administration argued to the Supreme Court that Title VII of the Civil Rights Act does not include sexual orientation or gender identity. The Trump administration removed the phrase "sexual orientation" from anti-discrimination guidelines from the U.S. Department of the Interior.

Near the end of Trump's term, on December 7, 2020, the administration finalized a rule allowing faith-based employers to discriminate against LGBT employees in their contracts with the federal government.

==== Foreign anti LGBT laws ====
In February 2019, it was announced that Richard Grenell was leading the Trump administration's newly formed effort to promote the decriminalization of homosexuality in nations in which homosexuality was illegal.

In April 2020, Grenell said the administration was considering policies to reduce intelligence-sharing with countries that criminalize homosexuality.

==== Judicial appointments ====
Trump made three Supreme Court nominations:

- On January 31, 2017, the Trump administration formally nominated Neil Gorsuch to be a Supreme Court Justice. The LGBT rights organization Lambda Legal called Gorsuch "hostile" to LGBT rights after he voted with the majority on the 10th Circuit Court on the Hobby Lobby case in June 2013 and underscored it by penning an opinion. Gorsuch was confirmed and sworn in on April 7, 2017. In June 2020 Gorsuch wrote the Supreme Court majority opinion affirming that gay and transgender persons are included in the protection from discrimination by Title VII of the Civil Rights Act of 1964.
- On July 9, 2018, the Trump administration formally nominated Brett Kavanaugh to be a Supreme Court Justice. At the time, Kavanaugh's position on LGBT rights was unclear. Less than a year earlier, Kavanaugh had praised former Chief Justice William Rehnquist for "stemming the general tide of freewheeling judicial creation of unenumerated rights that were not rooted in the nation's history and tradition". Kavanaugh was confirmed and sworn in on October 6, 2018. Kavanaugh dissented from the majority opinion of June 2020 that included gay and transgender persons in the protection from discrimination by Title VII, arguing the decision should be left to Congress.
- On September 26, 2020, the Trump administration formally nominated Amy Coney Barrett to be a Supreme Court Justice. Barrett's position on LGBT rights was unclear.

By September 2020, Trump had appointed over 200 federal judges. At least two are openly gay.

- Mary Rowland, who is openly lesbian, was Trump's first LGBTQ judicial nominee to be confirmed by the Senate. She is a judge on the U.S. District Court of Northern Illinois.
- Patrick Bumatay, who is openly gay, was subsequently confirmed by the Senate to the Ninth Circuit Court of Appeals.

According to a report released by Lambda Legal in 2019, more than one-third of Trump's 53 circuit court judicial nominees had a documented history of "anti-LGBTQ bias", including :

- Allison Jones Rushing, who has associated with the conservative organization Alliance Defending Freedom, was confirmed as a U.S. Circuit Judge of the U.S. Court of Appeals for the Fourth Circuit. She was nominated on August 27, 2018, and was confirmed with the support of all 53 Republican senators on March 5, 2019.

==== HIV prevention and treatment ====
On January 20, 2017, the day Trump was inaugurated, it was reported that the White House Office of National AIDS Policy (ONAP), formed in 1993, no longer had a webpage. ONAP's director, anticipating that the office might be disbanded, had tweeted farewell two weeks earlier. She asked people to continue following @aidsgov on Twitter, but that Twitter handle no longer exists either. In June 2017, six members of the Presidential Advisory Council on HIV/AIDS (PACHA) resigned, saying the President made their job difficult or pointless. The remaining members of the council were fired in a letter that arrived two days after Christmas. PACHA had no members and no activity throughout 2018, but reconvened in 2019 with new members.

Trump issued annual proclamations for World AIDS Day in each year of his presidency; none of the four proclamations mentioned LGBT people. Similarly, Vice President Mike Pence gave a speech for World AIDS Day 2018 without mentioning LGBT people.

In Trump's State of the Union address on February 5, 2019, he devoted a few words to announcing a new program by scientists in the Department of Health and Human Services (HHS) that hopes to reduce new HIV infections by 90% in ten years. On May 9, 2019, HHS announced that pharmaceutical company Gilead Sciences would donate pre-exposure prophylaxis medication to prevent HIV infection for up to 200,000 Americans until at least 2025 and possibly 2030.

Trump's 2019 budget request "completely eliminates funding for the AIDS Education and Training Centers (AETCs) and Special Projects of National Significance (SPNS), which are both programs run under the auspices of the Ryan White HIV/AIDS Program."

Trump's 2020 budget request included $300 million (~$367 million in 2025) in new funds for HIV programs within the United States. This consisted of $140 million for prevention through the CDC (an increase over the previous year), $70 million for the Ryan White Health Care Program, and $75 million for screenings and prophylactics. In the same budget, Trump sought to reduce funding for HIV research through the NIH and for global programs like PEPFAR, but Congress rejected those cuts.

Trump's 2021 budget request included $716 million (~$838 million in 2025) for the second year of HHS's initiative to end HIV in the United States (an increase of $450 million over the program's actual 2020 budget). At the same time, however, it would have cut the overall HHS budget by 9%. Additionally, it would have cut the Housing and Urban Development (HUD) budget by 15%, including cutting Housing Opportunities for People with AIDS (HOPWA) from $410 million in 2020 to $330 million in 2021.

==== Transgender soldier exclusion ====
On July 26, 2017, Trump announced on Twitter that transgender people would not be allowed to serve in the military "in any capacity", saying American forces could not afford the "tremendous medical costs and disruption" of transgender service members. However, a RAND study of 18 countries that allow transgender individuals to serve in the military found "little or no impact on unit cohesion, operational effectiveness, or readiness". Also, according to the Scientific American, studies have shown that the medical costs for transgender service members would be "minimal". Pentagon officials expressed dismay that Trump's tweets could open them up to lawsuits and the chairman of the Joint Chiefs of Staff said the policy on who is allowed to serve would not change until the White House sends the Defense Department new rules and the secretary of defense issues new guidelines. On August 25, Trump signed a memo prohibiting transgender individuals from joining the armed services unless the Secretary of Defense and the Secretary of Homeland Security recommend otherwise. The departments of Defense and Homeland Security are directed to determine what to do about currently serving transgender individuals.

The policy change faced legal challenges. Following a challenge in the U.S. District Court for the District of Columbia, on October 30, 2017, Judge Colleen Kollar-Kotelly blocked enforcement of the ban, writing that as far as could be seen, "all of the reasons proffered by the president for excluding transgender individuals from the military in this case were not merely unsupported, but were actually contradicted by the studies, conclusions and judgment of the military itself." In March 2018, Trump announced a new policy on transgender service members, namely a ban on those with a diagnosis of gender dysphoria, which would effectively be a ban on most transgender service members. The new policy was challenged in the U.S. District Court for the Western District of Washington. On April 13, 2018, Judge Marsha J. Pechman blocked enforcement of the policy, ruling that the administration's updated policy essentially repeated the same issues as its predecessor order from 2017, and that transgender service members (and transgender individuals as a class) were a protected class entitled to strict scrutiny of adverse laws (or at worst, a quasi-suspect class), and ordered that matter continue to a full trial hearing on the legality of the proposed policy. On January 21, 2019, the Supreme Court—with Chief Justice John Roberts and Justices Samuel Alito, Neil Gorsuch, Brett Kavanaugh and Clarence Thomas forming the majority for the 5-4 opinion—allowed Trump's policy to go into effect while challenges in lower courts are adjudicated. On March 12, 2019, acting Deputy Defense Secretary David Norquist signed a directive to allow Trump's policy to take effect in 30 days.

==== Other transgender issues ====
In February 2017, Trump's Justice Department withdrew a motion that had previously been filed by the Justice Department, "seeking to allow transgender students in public schools to use the restroom with which they identify". The move, which occurred within two days of Jeff Sessions becoming U.S. Attorney General, was condemned by the Human Rights Campaign, an LGBT rights advocacy group.

In October 2018 it was reported that the Trump administration is considering a definition of a person's gender as based on their genitalia at birth and not changeable later in life, in effect defining transgender out of existence. Responding to protests against the move, Trump said gender issues are in flux and he aims to "protect the country".

On November 23, 2018, the administration officials removed the Office of Personnel Management guidance intended to protect transitioning employees against adverse actions.

On May 24, 2019, the Trump administration proposed a regulation to remove gender identity protections by the Department of Health.

On October 12, 2019, Trump spoke at the Values Voters Summit in Washington, D.C. The day had begun with a plenary session that included three speakers on the topic of "Transgender Movement: Separating Facts from Fiction(s)". Those speakers were Kathy Grace Duncan, identified as a "transgender survivor"; Lynn Meagher; and Dr. Andre Van Mol of the American College of Pediatricians.

On October 16, 2019, the Justice Department held a ceremony for the 10th anniversary of the Matthew Shepard and James Byrd Jr. law against hate crimes. Matthew Shepard's parents were invited but could not attend. A staff member of the Matthew Shepard Foundation read aloud the parents' written statement: "We find it interesting and hypocritical that he [Attorney General William Barr] would invite us to this event commemorating a hate crime law named after our son and Mr. Byrd, while, at the same time, asking the Supreme Court to allow the legalized firing of transgender employees." The audience responded with a standing ovation.

==== Pride Month ====
During his four years as president, Trump acknowledged LGBT Pride Month once in 2019.

On May 31, 2019, Trump made a two-tweet statement on Twitter that was reproduced on a government website the next day as a "Statement from the President". "As we celebrate LGBT Pride Month," the tweet began, we must "stand in solidarity with the many LGBT people who live in dozens of countries worldwide that punish, imprison, or even execute individuals on the basis of their sexual orientation." He cited his administration's "global campaign to decriminalize homosexuality" (a reference to a meeting that had been recently hosted by Ambassador Richard Grenell). It was the first time a Republican president had acknowledged pride month, and the first time Trump had tweeted the acronym "LGBT" since assuming office. Some counted this tweet as an official presidential recognition of Pride Month. However, Trump's statement had apparently not been coordinated with any LGBT advocacy groups, nor did he attend any Pride events. Days later, the Trump administration mixed its message by ordering U.S. embassies not to fly the Pride flag.

In 2019, the Trump Make America Great Again Committee began selling "LGBTQ for Trump" T-shirts. In 2020, it was instead selling shirts with the slogan "Make America Great Again" printed in a rainbow font, which the product description claimed would "show your support for the LGBT community." These shirts fundraise for the Trump campaign, not for LGBT causes.

On October 13, 2020, the Trump campaign hosted an event they called "Trump Pride" in Newtown Square, Pennsylvania. The event was hosted by Lara Trump (the wife of Donald Trump's son, Eric) and Richard Grenell (the former U.S. ambassador to Germany). Tiffany Trump (Donald Trump's daughter) and Richard Grenell spoke at similar "Trump Pride" events in Tampa, Florida later that week and in Pittsburgh, Pennsylvania on November 1. The events were branded with the word "PRIDE" in rainbow colors. Donald Trump did not appear at these events. As of October 23, 2020, a "Trump Pride" section on Trump's campaign website stated that Trump "openly support[ed] the LGBT community since his first day in office," entered office "in support of marriage equality," made a "bold plan to end the HIV epidemic," and has a "global campaign to decriminalize homosexuality in the 69 nations where it is illegal." No additional policies, details, or statuses were provided on the website. The "Trump Pride" co-chairs were named as Richard Grenell, Jill Homan, Charles Moran, and Bill White, and the other 19 advisory board members were Michael Baker, Chris Barron, Martina Bolano, Matthew Craffey, Jamie Ensley, Stephen Gale, Bryan Eure, Dan Innis, Bob Kabel, "Brokeback Patriot," William McLaughlin, "The Gay Who Strayed," Ernest Olivias, Ashton T. Randle, Rebecca Schiff, Shane Shannon, Rob Smith, Andre Soriano, and Ed Williams.

==== Amplifying anti-LGBT voices ====
After the LGBT Center in Greenwich Village canceled a planned public event in March 2019 that was to feature three gay men and a transgender woman who had left the Democratic Party and become Trump supporters, one of the men, Brandon Straka, founder of the WalkAway campaign, sued the LGBT Center for $20 million (~$24.8 million in 2025). On the morning of July 14, 2019, Trump tweeted 22 times within 15 minutes in support of Straka.

On August 3, 2019, Trump retweeted Robert Jeffress, saying simply that Jeffress and his wife are "A great couple!" Jeffress is a Southern Baptist who believes all other religions (including Catholicism and Mormonism) lead to spiritual damnation. He has described gay sexuality as "miserable" and "filthy", transgender identity as an "emotional disorder", sex outside of "one man and one woman in a marriage" as "a deviation from God's original plan", and support for same-sex marriage as "paving the way for the Antichrist".

Ralph Drollinger, a pastor who leads a Bible study group for Trump's Cabinet members (though Trump himself does not attend), wrote on his Capitol Ministries blog on March 21, 2020, that "a proclivity toward lesbianism and homosexuality indicates an abandonment of God that will provoke God's wrath."

==== Human rights ====
After Trump's inauguration, the State Department initially kept U.S. diplomat Randy W. Berry in his position as the State Department's Special Envoy for the Human Rights of LGBTI Persons, a post created in 2015 under the Obama administration. This decision surprised pro-LGBT rights groups such as GLAAD and initially seemed to be a defeat for Christian right groups such as the Family Research Council, which "implored Trump to launch a major purge of pro-LGBT diplomats inside Foggy Bottom". However, in November 2017, Berry was reassigned to serve as a "deputy assistant secretary" for the State Department's Bureau of Democracy, Human Rights and Labor, while supposedly the "role and responsibilities" of the Special Envoy were being covered by the same bureau's Deputy Assistant Secretary of State Scott Busby. The position of Special Envoy remains vacant as of July 2019. A State Department webpage viewed in March 2019 said "this position is currently vacant," but that URL no longer even indicates there is a position to fill, as it now redirects to an archived page from the Obama administration. In 2018, the Trump administration denied visas to the same-sex partners of foreign diplomats if they were not married and even if they were from countries which recognize only civil partnership or which ban same-sex marriage.

On July 8, 2019, the State Department announced the creation of a new commission to examine human rights in foreign policy. The Commission on Unalienable Rights will have eight men and four women. Working off a preliminary list of the expected members of the commission, the LGBTQ rights organization GLAAD found that seven of those people (Mary Ann Glendon, Peter Berkowitz, Hamza Yusuf Hanson, Jacqueline Rivers, Meir Soloveichik, Christopher Tollefsen, and F. Cartwright Weiland) had previously made anti-LGBTQ remarks. The remaining five members were Russell Berman, Paolo Carozza, Kiron Skinner, Katrina Lantos Swett, and David Tse-Chien Pan; however, Skinner left the State Department in August 2019.

In November 2019, it was reported that Merritt Corrigan, a former RNC employee who once tweeted that the "LGBT agenda" is "tyrannical" and that the US was a "homo-empire," had begun a new job at the Hungarian embassy in Washington. She was later made the deputy White House liaison to USAID but lost that job in 2020 after making more anti-LGBTQ tweets.

==== On prejudice ====
On February 13, 2020, journalist Geraldo Rivera asked Trump: "Would Americans vote for a gay man to be president?" This was in reference to one of the leading Democratic candidates. Trump said that Pete Buttigieg's sexual orientation "doesn't seem to be hurting" him in the primaries, and that he would not count himself among Americans who would refuse to vote for someone simply because of their sexual orientation.

=== After presidency ===
On November 6, 2021, former President Trump welcomed the Log Cabin Republicans to host their "Spirit of Lincoln Gala" at Mar-a-Lago in Florida, and Melania Trump was given the organization's "Spirit of Lincoln Award" for supporting the Log Cabin Republicans interests; it was then announced that the organization would partner with the RNC to create the "RNC Pride Coalition" to promote outreach to LGBTQ voters. The RNC later clarified that the Pride Coalition would hire one staffer and that the announcement did not make any changes to the then GOP platform which opposed same-sex marriage.

On January 3, 2022, Trump said he extended his "complete support" to Hungary's far-right, anti-LGBTQ prime minister, Viktor Orban. In March 2022, Trump said that he loves playing "the gay national anthem," the song, "Y.M.C.A." On March 31, 2022, Trump argued that he "did great with the gay population, as you know" while also joking to the Gays for Trump supporters, "you don't look gay." On December 15, 2022, he spoke again at the "Spirit of Lincoln Gala" at Mar-a-Lago for the Log Cabin Republicans saying, “We are fighting for the gay community, and we are fighting and fighting hard."

After announcing his candidacy for the 2024 Republican Party Presidential Primaries, Trump said that, if re-elected, he would rescind federal protections for transgender Americans, sign executive orders to prohibit federal agencies from supporting transgender identity, withhold funding from public institutions, including hospitals and public schools, that support transgender identity, and support legislation to prohibit gender-affirmation surgery for minors and to prohibit the use of federal funding to pay for gender-affirmation care at any age.

In March, 2024, Mar-a-Lago hosted a same-sex marriage with the approval of Trump's team for two men associated with the Log Cabin Republicans. Representing the Trump campaign, Melania Trump hosted a fundraiser for the Log Cabin Republicans with the event invitations announcing that the purpose was to promote outreach to voters in swing states. Without recognizing LGBT Pride Month in 2024, the Trump campaign instead released a statement focusing on the economy for potential LGBTQ voters, saying, “By bringing down inflation and the skyrocketing cost of living, cutting taxes, and restoring law and order in our communities, President Trump’s second term agenda will create a safer and more prosperous America for ALL Americans, regardless of gender, sexual orientation, race, religion, or creed!”

In July, 2024, the Trump campaign successfully lobbied for the RNC to adopt a new platform which removed opposition to same-sex marriage. In October, 2024, the Trump campaign, with the Log Cabin Republicans, launched the "Trump UNITY" coalition which were aimed at appealing to LGBTQ voters. The Trump UNITY events did not include the LGBTQ Pride flag and were noted for speakers not mentioning LGBTQ issues.

== Pornography ==
Prior to his candidacy, Donald Trump participated in softcore pornography advertisements and promotions for Playboy, including at least three softcore videos for Playboy in 1994, 2000 and 2001 (the last featuring Playboy model and Trump's future wife Melania Knauss). He does not appear in any of the explicit scenes. His 1990 Playboy cover appearance was featured in a 2016 campaign post.

In July 2016, Trump signed a pledge that he would work to combat both legal and illegal pornography in the U.S., such as child pornography. In the pledge, put forth by the anti-pornography group Enough Is Enough, Trump promised to "give serious consideration to appointing a Presidential Commission to examine the harmful public health impact of Internet pornography on youth, families and the American culture and the prevention of the sexual exploitation of children in the digital age". Trump's opponent in the race, Hillary Clinton, wrote a letter of support for the pledge in lieu of signing, citing a campaign policy of abstaining from signing election pledges.
