= Civil law (legal system) =

Legal system originating in Western Europe

Legal systems of the world. Civil law-based systems are in blue, with mixed systems incorporating elements of both civil law and common law in pink.

Civil law is a legal system rooted in the Roman Empire and was comprehensively codified and disseminated starting in the 19th century, most notably with France's Napoleonic Code (1804) and Germany's Bürgerliches Gesetzbuch (1900). Unlike common law systems, which rely heavily on judicial precedent, civil law systems are characterized by their reliance on legal codes that function as the primary source of law. Today, civil law is the world's most common legal system, practiced in about 150 countries.

The civil law system is often contrasted with the common law system, which originated in medieval England. Whereas the civil law takes the form of legal codes, the common law comes from uncodified case law that arises as a result of judicial decisions, recognizing prior court decisions as legally binding precedent.

Historically, a civil law is the group of legal ideas and systems ultimately derived from the Corpus Juris Civilis, but heavily overlain by Napoleonic, Germanic, canonical, feudal, and local practices, as well as doctrinal strains such as natural law, codification, and legal positivism.

Conceptually, civil law formulates general principles and distinguishes substantive rules from procedural rules. It holds case law secondary and subordinate to statutory law. Civil law is often paired with the inquisitorial system, but the terms are not synonymous. There are key differences between a statute and a code. The most pronounced features of civil systems are their legal codes, with concise and broadly applicable texts that typically avoid factually specific scenarios. The short articles in a civil law code deal in generalities and stand in contrast with ordinary statutes, which are often very long and very detailed.

== Overview ==
The civil law system is the most widespread system of law in the world, in force in various forms in about 150 countries.

=== Origin and features ===
Civil law is sometimes referred to as neo-Roman law, Romano-Germanic law or Continental law. The expression "civil law" is a translation of Latin jus civile, or "citizens' law", which was the late imperial term for its legal system, as opposed to the laws governing conquered peoples (jus gentium); hence, the Justinian Code's title Corpus Juris Civilis. Civil law practitioners, however, traditionally refer to their system in a broad sense as jus commune. It draws heavily from Roman law, arguably the most intricate legal system before the modern era.

In civil law legal systems where codes exist, the primary source of law is the law code, a systematic collection of interrelated articles, arranged by subject matter in some pre-specified order. Codes explain the principles of law, rights, and entitlements, and how basic legal mechanisms work. The purpose of codification is to provide all citizens with manners and a written collection of the laws which apply to them and which judges must follow. Law codes are laws enacted by a legislature, even if they are in general much longer than other laws. Rather than a compendium of statutes or catalog of case law, the code sets out general principles as rules of law.

While the typical French-speaking supreme court decision is short, concise, and devoid of explanation or justification, in Germanic Europe, the supreme courts can and do tend to write more verbose opinions, supported by legal reasoning. A line of similar case decisions, while not precedent per se, constitute jurisprudence constante. While civil law jurisdictions place little reliance on court decisions, they tend to generate a phenomenal number of reported legal opinions. However, this tends to be uncontrolled, since there is no statutory requirement that any case be reported or published in a law report, except for the councils of state and constitutional courts. Except for the highest courts, all publication of legal opinions is unofficial or commercial.

=== Subcategories ===
Civil law systems can be divided into:

- those where Roman law in some form is still living law but there has been no attempt to create a civil code: Andorra and San Marino
- those with uncodified mixed systems in which civil law is an academic source of authority but common law is also influential: Scotland and the Roman-Dutch law countries (South Africa, Zimbabwe, Sri Lanka and Guyana)
- those with codified mixed systems in which civil law is the background law but has its public law heavily influenced by common law: Puerto Rico, Philippines, Quebec and Louisiana
- the Scandinavian legal systems, which are of a hybrid character since their background law is a mix of civil law and Scandinavian customary law and they have been partially codified. Likewise, the laws of the Channel Islands (Jersey, Guernsey, Alderney, Sark) mix Norman customary law and French civil law.
- those with comprehensive codes that exceed a single civil code, such as France, Germany, Greece, Italy, Japan, Chile, Mexico, Russia, Spain: it is this last category that is normally regarded as typical of civil law systems, and is discussed in the rest of this article.

=== Prominent civil codes ===
A prominent example of a civil law code is the Napoleonic Code (1804), named after French emperor Napoleon. The Napoleonic code comprises three components:

- the law of persons
- property law, and
- commercial law.

Another prominent civil code is the German Civil Code (Bürgerliches Gesetzbuch or BGB), which went into effect in the German empire in 1900. The German Civil Code is highly influential, inspiring the civil codes in countries such as Japan, South Korea and Switzerland (1907). It is divided into five parts:

1. The General Part, covering definitions and concepts, such as personal rights and legal personality.
2. Obligations, including concepts of debt, sale and contract;
3. Things (property law), including immovable and movable property;
4. Domestic relations (family law); and
5. Succession (estate law).

== History ==
Civil law takes as its major inspiration classical Roman law (c. AD 1–250), and in particular Justinian law (6th century AD), and further expanded and developed in the late Middle Ages under the influence of canon law. The Justinian Code's doctrines provided a sophisticated model for contracts, rules of procedure, family law, wills, and a strong monarchical constitutional system. Roman law was received differently in different countries. In some it went into force wholesale by legislative act, i.e., it became positive law, whereas in others it was diffused into society by increasingly influential legal experts and scholars.

Roman law continued without interruption in the Eastern Roman Empire until its final fall in the 15th century. However, given the empire's influence on the continent in Late Antiquity and then multiple incursions and occupations by Western European powers in the late medieval period, its laws became widely implemented in the West. It was first received in the Holy Roman Empire partly because it was considered imperial law, and it spread in Europe mainly because its students were the only trained lawyers. It became the basis of Scots law, though partly rivaled by received feudal Norman law. In England, it was taught academically at the universities of Oxford and Cambridge, but underlay only probate and matrimonial law insofar as both were inherited from canon law, and maritime law, adapted from lex mercatoria through the Bordeaux trade.

Consequently, neither of the two waves of Roman influence completely dominated in Europe. Roman law was ultimately a secondary source that was applied only when local customs and laws were found lacking on a certain subject. However, after a time, even local law came to be interpreted and evaluated primarily on the basis of Roman law, since it was a common European legal tradition of sorts, and thereby in turn influenced the main source of law. Eventually, the work of civilian glossators and commentators led to the development of a common body of law and writing about law, a common legal language, and a common method of teaching and scholarship, all termed the jus commune, or law common to Europe, which consolidated canon law and Roman law, and to some extent, feudal law.

== Codification ==
An important common characteristic of civil law, aside from its origins in Roman law, is the comprehensive codification of received Roman law, i.e., its inclusion in civil codes. The earliest codification known is the Code of Hammurabi, written in ancient Babylon during the 18th century BC. However, this, and many of the codes that followed, were mainly lists of civil and criminal wrongs and their punishments. The codification typical of modern civilian systems did not first appear until the Justinian Code.

Germanic codes appeared over the 6th and 7th centuries to clearly delineate the law in force for Germanic privileged classes versus their Roman subjects and regulate those laws according to folk-right. Under feudal law, a number of private custumals were compiled, first under the Norman empire (Très ancien coutumier, 1200–1245), then elsewhere, to record the manorial—and later regional—customs, court decisions, and the legal principles underpinning them. Custumals were commissioned by lords who presided as lay judges over manorial courts in order to inform themselves about the court process.

The use of custumals from influential towns soon became commonplace over large areas. In keeping with this, certain monarchs consolidated their kingdoms by attempting to compile custumals that would serve as the law of the land for their realms, as when Charles VII of France in 1454 commissioned an official custumal of Crown law. Two prominent examples include the Coutume de Paris (written 1510; revised 1580), which served as the basis for the Napoleonic Code, and the Sachsenspiegel (c. 1220) of the bishoprics of Magdeburg and Halberstadt which was used in northern Germany, Poland, and the Low Countries.

The concept of codification was further developed during the 17th and 18th centuries AD, as an expression of both natural law and the ideas of the Enlightenment. The political ideals of that era was expressed by the concepts of democracy, protection of property and the rule of law. Those ideals required certainty of law; recorded, uniform law. So, the mix of Roman law and customary and local law gave way to law codification. Also, the notion of a nation-state implied recorded law that would be applicable to that state. There was also a reaction to law codification. The proponents of codification regarded it as conducive to certainty, unity and systematic recording of the law; whereas its opponents claimed that codification would result in the ossification of the law.

In the end, despite whatever resistance to codification, the codification of Continental European private laws moved forward. Codifications were completed by Denmark (1687), Sweden (1734), Prussia (1794), France (1804), and Austria (1811). The French codes were imported into areas conquered by Napoleon and later adopted with modifications in Poland (Duchy of Warsaw/Congress Poland; Kodeks cywilny 1806/1825), Louisiana (1807), Canton of Vaud (Switzerland; 1819), the Netherlands (1838), Serbia (1844), Italy and Romania (1865), Portugal (1867) and Spain (1888). Germany (1900), and Switzerland (1912) adopted their own codifications. These codifications were in turn imported into colonies at one time or another by most of these countries. The Swiss version was adopted in Brazil (1916) and Turkey (1926).

Louisiana is the only U.S. state whose private civil law is based heavily on the French and Spanish codes, as opposed to English common law. In Louisiana, private law was codified into the Louisiana Civil Code. Current Louisiana law has converged considerably with American law, especially in its public law, judicial system, and adoption of the Uniform Commercial Code (except for Article 2) and certain legal devices of American common law. In fact, any innovation, whether private or public, has been decidedly common law in origin.

In theory, codes conceptualized in the civil law system should go beyond the compilation of discrete statutes, and instead state the law in a coherent, and comprehensive piece of legislation, sometimes introducing major reforms or starting anew. In this regard, civil law codes are more similar to the Restatements of the Law, the Uniform Commercial Code (which drew from European inspirations), and the Model Penal Code in the United States. In the United States, U.S. states began codification with New York's 1850 Field Code (laying down civil procedure rules and inspired by European and Louisiana codes). Other examples include California's codes (1872), and the federal revised statutes (1874) and the current United States Code (1926), which are closer to compilations of the statute than to systematic expositions of law akin to civil law codes.

For the legal system of Japan, beginning in the Meiji Era, European legal systems—especially the civil law of Germany and France—were the primary models for emulation. In China, the German Civil Code was introduced in the later years of the Qing dynasty, emulating Japan. In addition, it formed the basis of the law of the Republic of China, which remains in force in Taiwan. Furthermore, Taiwan and Korea, former Japanese colonies, have been strongly influenced by the Japanese legal system.

== Comparison with other legal systems ==
Civil law is primarily contrasted with the English common law that influenced the legal traditions of the English-speaking countries.

The primary contrast between the two systems is the role of written decisions and precedent as a source of law (one of the defining features of common law legal systems). While common law systems place great weight on precedent, civil law judges tend to give less weight to judicial precedent. For example, the Napoleonic Code expressly forbade French judges to pronounce general principles of law. There is no doctrine of stare decisis in the French civil law tradition. There are regular, good-quality law reports in France, but it is not a consistent practice in many of the existing civil law jurisdictions. In French-speaking colonial Africa there were no law reports and what little is known of those historical cases comes from publication in journals. Civil law codes must be changed constantly because the precedent of courts is not binding and because courts lack authority to act if there is no statute.

In some civil law jurisdictions the judiciary does not have the authority to invalidate legislative provisions. For example, after the fall of the Soviet Union, the Armenian Parliament, with substantial support from USAID, adopted new legal codes. Some of the codes introduced problems which the judiciary was not empowered to adjudicate under the established principles of the common law of contracts - they could only apply the code as written.

Codification, however, is by no means a defining characteristic for all civil law systems. For example, the civil law systems of Nordic countries over time have deviated significantly from their classical Roman and German models. Instead, the Scandinavian countries (Sweden, Norway, and Denmark) together with Finland, the Faroe Islands, Greenland, Åland (self-governing) and Iceland may be said to have a special "Nordic" version of jurisprudence that is neither a truly civil law system nor a part of the British-derived common law legal system.

In actual practice, an increasing degree of precedent is creeping into civil law jurisprudence, and is generally seen in many nations' highest courts.

Some authors consider civil law the foundation for socialist law used in communist countries, which in this view would basically be civil law with the addition of Marxist-Leninist ideals. Even if this is so, civil law was generally the legal system in place before the rise of socialist law, and some Eastern European countries reverted to the pre-socialist civil law following the fall of socialism, while others continued using a socialist legal system.

== Subgroups ==
The term civil law comes from English legal scholarship and is used in English-speaking countries to lump together all legal systems of the jus commune tradition. However, legal comparativists and economists promoting the legal origins theory prefer to subdivide civil law jurisdictions into distinct groups:

- Napoleonic: France, Italy, the Netherlands, Spain, Chile, Belgium, Luxembourg, Portugal, Brazil, Mexico, other CPLP countries, Macau, former Portuguese colonies in India (Goa, Daman and Diu and Dadra and Nagar Haveli), Malta, Romania, and most of the Arab world (e.g. Algeria, Tunisia, Egypt, Lebanon, etc.) when Islamic law is not used. Former colonies include Quebec (Canada) and Louisiana (U.S.).
  - The Chilean Code is an original work of jurist and legislator Andrés Bello. Traditionally, the Napoleonic Code has been considered the main source of inspiration for the Chilean Code. However, this is true only with regard to the law of obligations and the law of things (except for the principle of abstraction), while it is not true at all in the matters of family and successions. This code was integrally adopted by Ecuador, El Salvador, Nicaragua, Honduras, Colombia, Panama and Venezuela (although only for one year). According to other Latin American experts of its time, like Augusto Teixeira de Freitas (author of the "Esboço de um Código Civil para o Brasil") or Dalmacio Vélez Sársfield (main author of the Argentinian Civil Code), it is the most important legal accomplishment of Latin America.
  - Cameroon, a former colony of both France and the United Kingdom, is bi-juridical/mixed
- Germanistic: Germany, Austria, Switzerland, Latvia, Estonia, Roman-Dutch, Czech Republic, Russia, Lithuania, Croatia, Hungary, Serbia, Slovenia, Slovakia, Bosnia and Herzegovina, Greece, Ukraine, Turkey, Japan, South Korea, Taiwan and Thailand
  - South Africa, a former colony of the Netherlands and later the United Kingdom, was heavily influenced by English colonists and therefore is bi-juridical/mixed.
- Nordic: Denmark, Finland, Iceland, Norway, and Sweden
- Chinese (except Hong Kong and Macau) is a mixture of civil law and socialist law. Presently, Chinese laws absorb some features of the common law system, especially those related to commercial and international transactions. Hong Kong, although part of China, uses common law. The Basic Law of Hong Kong ensures the use and status of common law in Hong Kong. Macau continues to have a Portuguese legal system of civil law.

However, some of these legal systems are often and more correctly said to be of hybrid nature:

Napoleonic to Germanistic influence: The Italian civil code of 1942 replaced the original one of 1865, introducing German elements as a result of its World War II Axis alliance. This approach has been imitated by other countries, including Portugal (1966), the Netherlands (1992), Brazil (2002) and Argentina (2014). Most of them have innovations introduced by the Italian legislation, including the unification of the civil and commercial codes.

Germanistic to Napoleonic influence: The Swiss civil code is considered mainly influenced by the German civil code and partly influenced by the French civil code. The civil code of the Republic of Turkey is a slightly modified version of the Swiss code, adopted in 1926 during Mustafa Kemal Atatürk's presidency as part of the government's progressive reforms and secularization.

Syncretic systems: Some systems of civil law do not fit neatly into this typology. Polish law developed as a mixture of French and German civil law in the 19th century. After the reunification of Poland in 1918, five legal systems (French Napoleonic Code from the Duchy of Warsaw, German BGB from Western Poland, Austrian ABGB from Southern Poland, Russian law from Eastern Poland, and Hungarian law from Spisz and Orawa) were merged into one. Similarly, Dutch law, while originally codified in the Napoleonic tradition, has been heavily altered under influence from the Dutch native tradition of Roman-Dutch law (still in effect in its former colonies). Scotland's civil law tradition borrowed heavily from Roman-Dutch law. Swiss law is categorized as Germanistic, but it has been heavily influenced by the Napoleonic tradition, with some indigenous elements added in as well.

Quebec law, whose private law is also of French civil origin, has developed along the same lines, adapting in the same way as Louisiana to the public law and judicial system of Canadian common law. By contrast, Quebec private law has innovated mainly from civil sources. To a lesser extent, other states formerly part of the Spanish Empire, such as Texas and California, have also retained aspects of Spanish civil law into their legal system, for example community property. The legal system of Puerto Rico exhibits similarities to that of Louisiana: a civil code whose interpretations rely on both the civil and common law systems. Because Puerto Rico's Civil Code is based on the Spanish Civil Code of 1889, available jurisprudence has tended to rely on common law innovations due to the code's age and, in many cases, obsolete nature.

Several Islamic countries have civil law systems that contain elements of Islamic law. As an example, the Egyptian Civil Code of 1949—which remains in force in Egypt and is the basis for the civil law in many countries of the Arab world where the civil law is used— is based on the Napoleonic Code, but its primary author Abd El-Razzak El-Sanhuri attempted to integrate principles and features of Islamic law in deference to the unique circumstances of Egyptian society.

Japanese Civil Code is considered a mixture drawing roughly 60% from the German civil code, roughly 30% from the French civil code, 8% from Japanese customary law, and 2% from English law. Regarding the latter, the code borrows the doctrine of ultra vires and the precedent of Hadley v Baxendale from English common law system.

== Countries with civil law systems ==
Some countries where civil law is practiced include:

- Continental Europe (except Andorra, including Armenia, Azerbaijan, and Georgia)
- East Asia, Central Asia, and the Middle East (such as China, Indonesia, Japan, Kyrgyzstan, and Turkey)
- Central and South America (except Guyana, Belize, Cuba and the Falkland Islands)
- North Africa, Lusophone Africa, and Francophone Africa (such as Egypt, Angola, and Cote d'Ivoire)

=== Colombia ===
In Colombia, the legal system follows the civil law tradition, where statutory law constitutes the primary source of legal authority. The system is grounded in the Political Constitution of 1991, which establishes the supremacy of the Constitution and the principle of the rule of law. Legislative enactments, particularly codes, play a central role, including the Colombian Civil Code and the General Code of Procedure, which regulate substantive rights and judicial processes respectively.

Under Colombian law, judges are primarily subject to the Constitution and statutory law as the main sources of legal authority. However, jurisprudence, judicial precedent, and legal doctrine operate as auxiliary criteria for the interpretation and application of legal norms, as expressly provided in Article 230 of the Constitution and interpreted by the Constitutional Court.

In its landmark decision C-836/01, the Constitutional Court clarified that judges are bound by the Constitution and the law as primary sources, but must also ensure consistency in judicial decisions by considering prior jurisprudence. The Court emphasized that equality in judicial activity requires similar cases to be decided in a consistent manner and that judges must expressly take into account relevant precedent.

The Court further held that departure from established jurisprudence is permissible only if it is duly justified through clear and reasoned arguments, reinforcing the role of precedent as a guiding element within the civil law system without displacing statutory law as the primary source.

== See also ==
- Chinese law
- Civil law notary
- International Roman Law Moot Court
- List of national legal systems
- Rule according to higher law
- Tort

== Bibliography ==
- Beaulac, Stéphane & Jean-François Gaudreault-DesBiens. Common law and civil law: a comparative primer. Montreal: Thémis, 2017.
- De Vries, Henry P., George A. Schneider, & René David. Civil law and the Anglo-American lawyer: a case-illustrated introduction to civil law institutions and method. Dobbs Ferry, N.Y.: Oceania Publications, 1975.
- Glendon, Mary Ann, Carozza, Paolo G., & Colin B. Picker. Comparative Legal Traditions in a Nutshell, 4th edn. West Academic Publishing, 2015.
- Glendon, Mary Ann, Carozza, Paolo G., & Colin B. Picker. Comparative Legal Traditions: Text, Materials and Cases on Western Law, 4th edn. West Academic Publishing, 2014.
- Glenn, H. Patrick. Legal Traditions of the World, 5th edn. Oxford: Oxford University Press, 2014 (1st edn 2000).
- Hamza, Gábor. Origine e sviluppo degli ordinamenti giusprivatistici moderni in base alla tradizione del diritto romano. Santiago de Compostela: Andavira, 2013.
- Jansen, Nils. The development and making of legal doctrine. Cambridge: Cambridge University Press, 2010.
- Kischel, Uwe. Comparative Law. Trans. Andrew Hammel. Oxford: Oxford University Press, 2019.
- Lundmark, Thomas W. Charting the Divide Between Common and Civil Law. NY: Oxford University Press, 2012.
- Lydorf, Claudia. (2011). Romance Legal Family. Mainz: Institute of European History.
- MacQueen, Hector L. "Scots Law and the Road to the New Ius Commune." Electronic Journal of Comparative Law 4, no. 4 (December 2000).
- Moreno Navarrete, M. A. The Concept of Civil Law. Historical Dimension. Revista de Derecho Actual, vol. III, 2017.
- John Henry Merryman & Rogelio Pérez-Perdomo. The Civil Law Tradition: An Introduction to the Legal Systems of Europe and Latin America, 4th edn. Palo Alto, Cal.: Stanford University Press, 2018.
- Moustaira, Elina N. Comparative Law: University Courses (in Greek), Ant. N. Sakkoulas Publishers, Athens, 2004, ISBN 960-15-1267-5
- Reynolds, Thomas H. (1998). "Introduction to Foreign and Comparative Law". In Rehberg, Jeanne; Popa, Radu D (eds.). Accidental Tourist on the New Frontier: An Introductory Guide to Global Legal Research. F.B. Rothman. pp. 47–86. ISBN 978-0-837-71075-4.
- Arthur T. von Mehren & James Gordley. The civil law system, 2nd edn. Boston: Little, Brown & Co., 1977.
- Zimmermann, Reinhard. Roman law, contemporary law, European law: The civilian tradition today. NY: Oxford University Press, 2001.
