= Social policy of the Trump administration =

The social policy of the Trump administration may refer to:

- Social policy of the first Trump administration
- Social policy of the second Trump administration
