= Undeclared Wars with Israel =

2015 book by Jeffrey Herf

Undeclared Wars with Israel: East Germany and the West German Far Left, 1967–1989
- Author: Jeffrey Herf
- Language: English
- Genre: Non-fiction
- Publisher: Cambridge University Press
- Publication date: 2015

Undeclared Wars with Israel: East Germany and the West German Far Left, 1967–1989 is a book by Jeffrey Herf, published by Cambridge University Press in 2015. The book argues that East Germany in particular was extremely hostile to Israel and waged "undeclared wars" against it by funding Arab militant groups and other anti-Israel actions. The book received positive reviews for being well researched and uncovering new information on East Germany's relationship with Israel.

== Content ==
The book discusses the period between the Six-Day War in 1967 and the fall of the Berlin Wall, chronicling such incidents as the Munich massacre (1972), Yom Kippur War (1973), the Kiryat Shmona and Ma'alot terror attacks in Israel in 1975, the "Zionism is racism" declaration (1975), the Entebbe hijacking and attacks on theaters that screened Victory at Entebbe (1976), Lebanon War, and West Berlin discotheque bombing (1986).

His approach, in contrast to German historians who have examined the same subject, includes as sources Jewish victims of attacks. He also draws on extensive archive research in SED's Politburo, the GDR Council of Ministers, the GDR's foreign and defense ministries, and elsewhere.

According to Herf's research, the East German state sent "750,000 Kalashnikov assault weapons; 120 MiG fighter jets; 180,000 anti-personnel land mines; 235,000 grenades; 25,000 rocket-propelled grenade (RPG) launchers; and 25 million cartridges of various sizes" to countries and groups at war with Israel. Some of these went to the PLO, the Democratic Front for the Liberation of Palestine, and the Popular Front for the Liberation of Palestine. Herf describes how East Germany funded Palestinian militant groups and West German radical leftists were trained by Fatah, the PFLP, and other groups to carry out attacks on Israeli targets. He also discusses the "propaganda war against Israel" waged at the United Nations and other international organizations. Using anti-Israel actions, East Germany was able to obtain diplomatic recognition outside the Eastern Bloc, from countries such as Iraq, Sudan, Syria, and Egypt. Herf finds that the East German government distinguished between "moderates" and "extremists" in the Arab world:

An “extremist” was a terrorist who extended “the international class struggle” to include attacks in Western Europe while a “moderate” was a terrorist from the Arab states or the Palestinian organizations who focused attacks only against Israel, and perhaps “imperialist” targets outside Western Europe.

Herf notes the difference between West Germany, which had an "eleventh commandment" of doing no harm to Jews, and East Germany, which had no such premise. He praises the role of West German Jewish leader Heinz Galinski, who wrote editorials denouncing antisemitism on the left. In contrast, Herf is critical of Willy Brandt, because "The West German chancellor who famously kneeled in an act of atonement at the memorial to the Jews killed in the Warsaw Ghetto declared his country to be neutral in the most dire days in Israel’s history since 1948 [the Yom Kippur war]." He describes the essay of Ulrike Meinhof defending the Munich massacre as "one of the most important documents in the history of antisemitism in Europe after the Holocaust".

== Reception ==
In Holocaust and Genocide Studies, Russell Berman praised the book for being well researched. He writes that the book sheds light on "an important study of a difficult and multidimensional chapter in the history of Germans and Jews".

Martin Jander praised Herf's "excellent analysis".

Pertti Ahonen described it as a "meticulously researched study", although one that sometimes gets bogged down in repetitive arguments and excessive detail on arms shipments.

Allan Arkush describes the book "prodigiously researched indictment" and "a timely reminder" but predicts that the "tale of two hatreds would [not] shame" those who continue the politics Herf describes in the present.
