= Kiki of Paris =

French plastician photographer

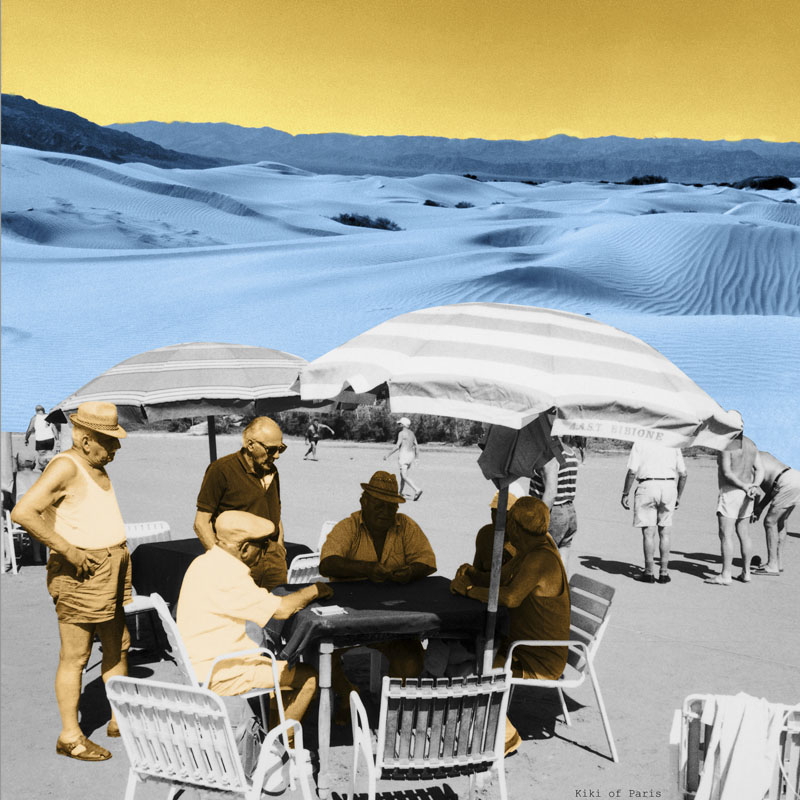
- Ici et maintenant, 2010
- Born: 1945 (age 80–81); Paris, France
- Notable work: Photographer
- Website: https://www.kikiofparis.com/en

Kiki of Paris is the pseudonym of a French plastician photographer, born in 1945 in Paris.

== Biography ==
Born in Paris after World War II, he first studied human and social sciences before turning to drawing and painting. In Montparnasse, the actor Michel Simon introduces him to the writer Henry Miller, who advises him to focus on photography. This meeting is a turning point in his career.

His first shots were ethnographic documents; at that time he worked with the ethnologist Robert Jaulin. Kiki of Paris traveled to Asia, Central Europe, Cuba, Jamaica and, above all, to the United States, where he lives for some time in California and Nevada.

At the beginning of the 1990s he orients his work towards humanist photography (Doisneau, Brassaï and especially Willy Ronis whom he often meets). Then he defines his new framework by choosing strong themes such as daily life, the Italian summer, party...

In 1996, on the advice of a Swiss collector, American investors buy his large format photographs. Kiki of Paris then exhibits in Nassau, Seattle, Paris, Tokyo, Luxembourg and in group exhibitions. The collection "Un été vénitien" (A Venetian summer) meets with great success everywhere. It will be followed by a collection created in Berlin and in Central Europe, on the theme of the funfair, in tribute to Fernand Léger.

In 2006, the Kiki of Paris Committee was created. The purpose of this association is to make the artist's work known and to issue certificates of authenticity. Present in major French and foreign collections, his work regularly appears in public sales of contemporary Art.

Since 2000, Kiki of Paris is a member of the ADAGP.

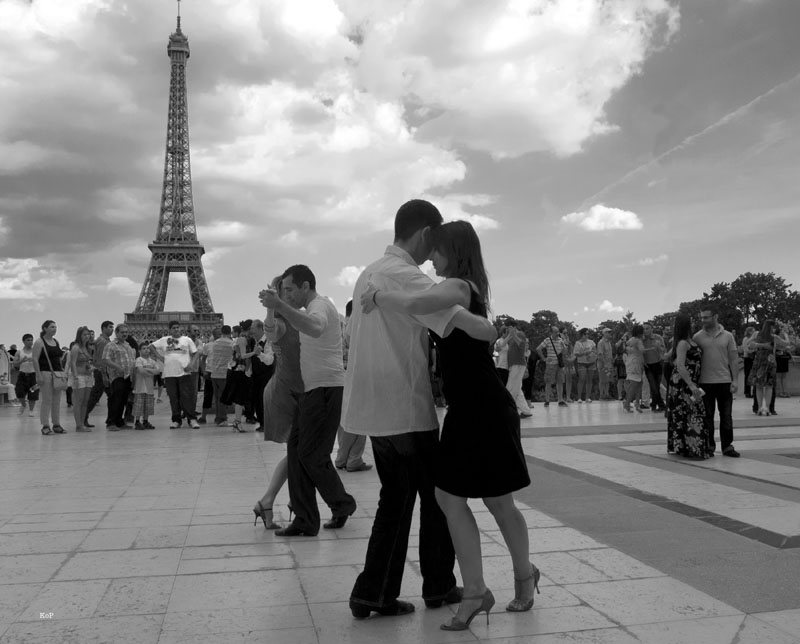
The Trocadero Dancers (Paris) 1989

== Style and technique ==
After studying structuralism applied to cultural anthropology and linguistics, and then mathematical relationships in aesthetics (especially perspectives), Kiki of Paris published "Primary and polymorphic structures" in 1999.

His works are sometimes introduced with a commentary, a kind of thread, as if the artist wanted to guide us into the depth of his experimental field. For the artist, the primary structures include reality in a fraction of time: meaning is systemic, everyone finds there what he or she sees. On the other hand, polymorphic structures are composed of a juxtaposition of elements, that brings a revealing meaning that none of the parts, taken separately, can allow to grasp. Kiki of Paris's work differs from that of Martin Parr, the master of vernacular photography. For Parr, ordinary scenes are self-sufficient in all their irony and pathos; whereas Kiki of Paris mixes them together to give them a new meaning.

Among the influences on Kiki of Paris's work, we should note the encounters, even the brief ones, that have guided his choices and his destiny: Henry Miller of course; but also the American director Joseph Losey; and of course the survivors of the beat generation passing through Paris, especially William Burroughs and his worrying gaze, according to Kiki of Paris.

"What makes the image is culture, photography is a piece of time encapsulated, the result is a composite chemistry. Add to this the "right moment, the time T, the meeting between the idea, the concept, the aesthetic and a well-framed subject".

Trained as an ethnologist, Kiki of Paris observes his contemporaries and their interactions in the city. This specificity provides his work with accurate but sometimes cruel analyses, and increases the meticulousness of his work approach and study.

The requirement can be seen in his production, voluntarily limited. For a few works per year, thousands of pictures are irretrievably destroyed. As an example, some of his compositions such as "The Messenger" required more than a year of research to be finalized. The artist exhibits very little, most often at private collectors' meetings.

== Main exhibitions ==
- 1999 Telos Institute (Seattle)
- 2001 Nart Gallery (Paris)
- 2002 Tokyo International Forum
- 2002 Atelier Visconti (Paris)
- 2002 Salon des Indépendants (Paris)
- 2004 Hype Gallery Palais de Tokyo (Paris)
- 2004 2009 Galerie ARTEnovance

== Publications ==
- 1984 Bars de nuit à Paris — Night bars in Paris
- 1985 Fractures sociales, l'example de Belleville — Social fractures. The example of Belleville
- 1989 Obliques et perspectives — Obliques and perspectives
- 1999 Structures primaires et polymorphes — Primary and polymorphic structures
- 2001 Kiki of Paris (Telos Institute)
