= Timothy Luke =

American sociologist

Academic background
- Education: University of Arizona; Washington University in St. Louis

Academic work
- Discipline: Political Science
- Institutions: University of Arizona; University of Missouri; University of Missouri–St. Louis; Washington University in St. Louis; Virginia Tech

Timothy W. Luke (born June 28, 1951) is university distinguished professor of political science at Virginia Tech.

== Education ==
He received a B.A. with high distinction in government and English from the University of Arizona in 1972; a M.A. in political science from the University of Arizona in 1975; a M.A. in political science from Washington University in St. Louis in 1977; and in 1981, a Ph.D. in political science from Washington University.

== Career ==
His areas of research and teaching specialization include environmental politics and cultural studies as well as comparative politics, international political economy, and modern critical social and political theory. Many articles and book chapters by him on these topics have been published in scholarly journals and books in the United States and abroad. He has been very actively involved with critical theory communities tied to the Frankfurt School, the critique of mainstream social sciences, critical geopolitics, and environmental political theory groups associated with journals like Capitalism Nature Socialism, New Political Science, International Political Sociology, and TELOS for many years.

During 1996, he served as visiting research and teaching scholar at The Open Polytechnic of New Zealand, and in 1995 he was the Fulbright Professor of Cultural Theory and the Politics of Information Society at Victoria University of Wellington in New Zealand. In 1994–1995, he was a key organizer of the Virginia Tech Cyberschool, a founder of the Center for Digital Discourse and Culture in 1997, and the first executive director of the Institute of Distance and Distributed Learning at Virginia Tech from 1998 to 2001. As part of these activities, he created the first entirely online MA degree program in political science available in the US at Virginia Tech. He has taught in the past at the University of Arizona, the University of Missouri, the University of Missouri–St. Louis, and Washington University.

== Works ==
- Tim Luke's Online Papers
- Ideology and Soviet Industrialization (Contributions in Political Science), Greenwood Press, 1985. 283 pp. ISBN 0-313-23831-6
- Social Theory and Modernity: Critique, Dissent, and Revolution, Sage Publications, 1990. 278 pp. ISBN 0-8039-3861-6
- Shows of Force: Power, Politics, and Ideology in Art Exhibitions, Duke University Press, 1992. 264 pp. ISBN 0822311232\
- “Searching for Alternatives: Postmodern Populism and Ecology”. Telos 103 (Spring 1995). New York: Telos Press.
- Ecocritique: Contesting the Politics of Nature, Economy, and Culture, University of Minnesota Press, 1997. 272 pp. ISBN 0-8166-2847-5
- Capitalism, Democracy, and Ecology: DEPARTING FROM MARX, University of Illinois Press, 1999. 272 pp. ISBN 0-252-06729-0
- Museum Politics: Power Plays at the Exhibition, University of Minnesota Press, 2002. 265 pp. ISBN 0-8166-1989-1
- "Displaying the Enola Gay, hiding Hiroshima", Arena Journal 22 (January 1, 2004), p. 73
- Vectors of Virtualization, Sage Publications, 2005. 240 pp. ISBN 0-7619-5830-4
- "The Anthropocene and Freedom: Terrestrial time as political mystification", Platypus Review 60 (October, 2013)

== See also ==
- Telos Press
- Paul Piccone
- Fordism
