= Telos (journal) =

Quarterly peer-reviewed academic journal

- Discipline: Politics, philosophy, critical theory, culture
- Language: English
- Edited by: David Pan

Publication details
- History: 1968–present
- Publisher: Telos Press Publishing (U.S.)
- Frequency: Quarterly
- Impact factor: 0.1 (2023)

Standard abbreviations
- ISO 4: Telos

Indexing
- ISSN: 0090-6514
- LCCN: 73641746
- OCLC no.: 1785433

Links
- Journal homepage; Online access; Online archive

Telos is a quarterly peer-reviewed academic journal that publishes articles on politics, philosophy, and critical theory, with a particular focus on contemporary political, social, and cultural issues.

Established in May 1968 by Paul Piccone and fellow students at SUNY-Buffalo with the intention of providing the New Left with a coherent theoretical perspective, the journal, which has long considered itself heterodox, has been described as turning to the right politically beginning in the 1980s.

The journal's masthead lists its editor as David Tse-Chien Pan and its editor emeritus as Russell A. Berman. Piccone died of cancer in 2004 at age 64.

== History ==
The journal was established by Paul Piccone and fellow working-class philosophy students in May 1968 at SUNY-Buffalo, though it was never formally associated with SUNY or any other university. Elisabeth K. Chaves writes that "this non-institutionalization, in academia or elsewhere, helped keep the journal distinct from other positions within the [intellectual] field, and it reveals a kinship to artists within the field of cultural production that choose to practice 'art for art's sake,' disdaining the economic and political power found at the dominant pole."

According to Chaves, the journal specifically saw its objective as "vindicat[ing] the ineradicability of subjectivity, the teleology of the Western project, and the possibility of regrounding such a project by means of a phenomenological and dialectical reconstitution of Marxism in conjunction with the New Left." In this light, the journal sought to expand the Husserlian diagnosis of "the crisis of European sciences" to prefigure a particular program of social reconstruction relevant for the United States. In order to avoid the high level of abstraction typical of Husserlian phenomenology, however, the journal began introducing the ideas of Western Marxism and of the critical theory of the Frankfurt School to a North American audience. In a 1971 pamphlet, in reference to its heterodoxy, members of the Chicago Surrealist Group said Telos conference organizers were "capable only of promoting the peaceful coexistence of various modes of confusion".

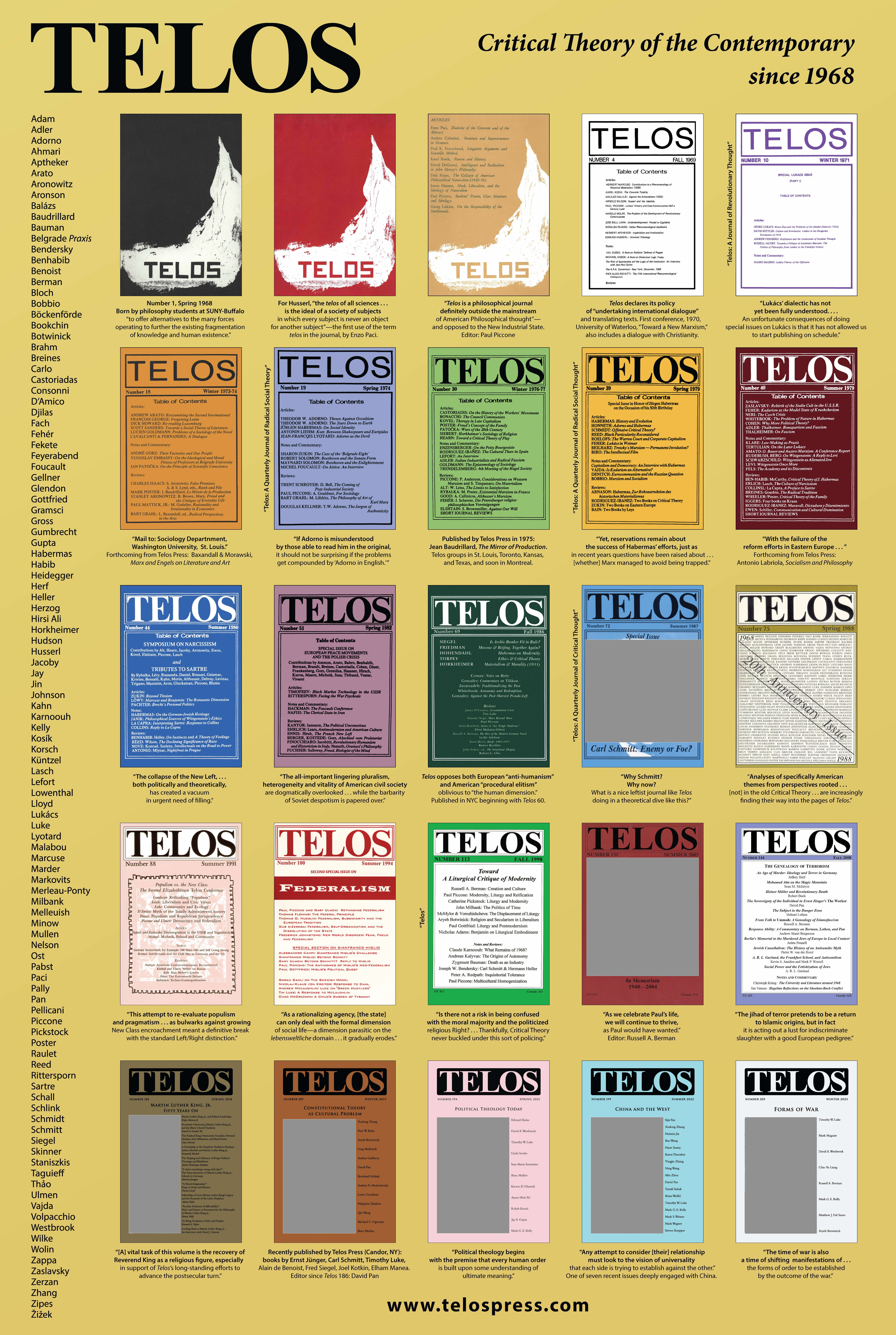
Poster from the Telos website describing the journal's development.

Over time, Telos became increasingly critical of the Left in general, with a reevaluation of 20th century intellectual history, including focuses on Carl Schmitt, federalism, and American populism through the work of Christopher Lasch. Eventually the journal rejected the traditional divisions between Left and Right as a legitimating mechanism for new class domination and an occlusion of new, post-Fordist political conflicts—part of its critique of the New Class or professional-managerial class. This led to a reevaluation of the primacy of culture and to efforts to understand the dynamics of cultural disintegration and reintegration as a precondition for the constitution of that autonomous individuality critical theory had always identified as the telos of Western civilization.

During the journal's "conservative turn" in the 1980s, many editorial board members, including Jürgen Habermas, left Telos. The academic Joan Braune writes that one cause for the resignations was Piccone's support of the United States intervention in Nicaragua. According to Chaves, the journal's split with Habermas was due significantly to the second generation of Critical Theory's embrace of the linguistic turn. The paleoconservative Paul Gottfried, a former student of Herbert Marcuse, former Republican Party activist, and critic of neoconservatism, joined Telos in the 1980s and 1990s. In January 2025, he was not listed on the journal's masthead.

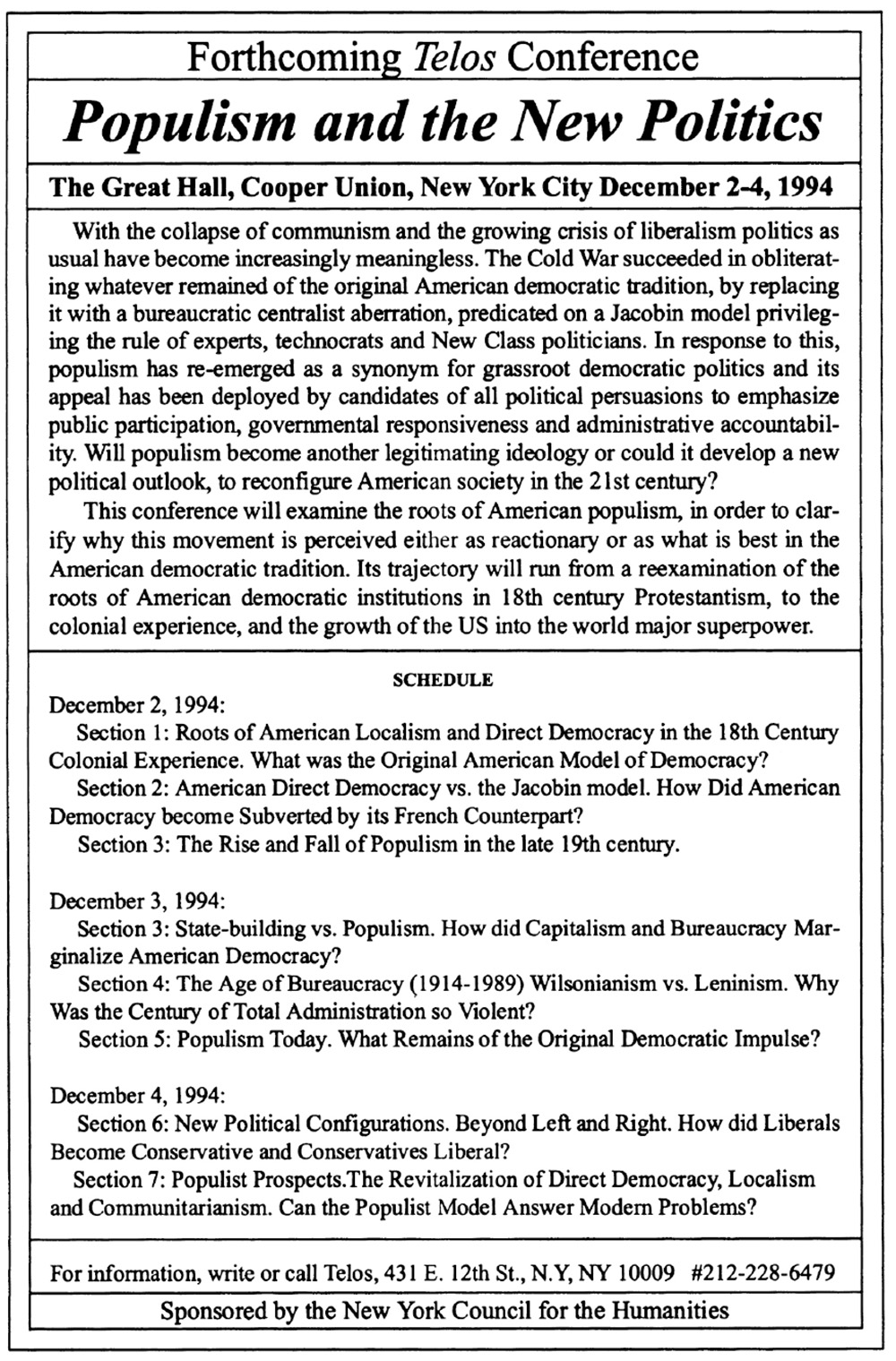
Advertisement for 1994 Telos conference "Populism and the New Politics"

European New Right figures such as Alain de Benoist were key contributors to Telos in the 1990s. Piccone asserted that the French New Right had incorporated "95 percent of standard New Left ideas". Joseph Lowndes describes Telos as "the major translator" to English of de Benoist and other New Right figures. Their ethnonationalist ideas later influenced the alt-right.

In 1994, the paleoconservative Sam Francis was a panelist at a Telos conference in New York about populism. The audience "shifted uncomfortably in their seats and chuckled in embarrassment" when Francis said the 1947 anti-austerity riots targeting Jews in England were an authentic form of populism to embrace, as recalled by Lowndes. Telos had ties with figures of the paleoconservative Chronicles magazine, and was sympathetic to the Lega Nord in Italy, though Telos' support for NATO military intervention against Serbia in 1999 to prevent ethnic cleansing was a tension with paleoconservatives.

Noting various criticisms, Timothy Luke, a Telos editor, described the journal in a 2005 remembrance of Piccone as "out beyond the margins of the established academy ... featuring the voices of alternative networks recruited from the contrary currents of many different intellectual traditions". According to Chaves, the journal "always maintained a critical distance from any party or political movement." Telos author John K. Bingley wrote in 2023 that "the clash of divergent opinions" is "at the core of [the journal's] identity."

The journal is published by Telos Press Publishing and the editor-in-chief is David Pan. It is affiliated with the Telos Institute, which hosts annual conferences, select papers from which are published in Telos.

== Abstracting and indexing ==
The journal is abstracted and indexed in the Social Sciences Citation Index, Arts & Humanities Citation Index, Current Contents/Social & Behavioral Sciences, and Current Contents/Arts & Humanities. According to the Journal Citation Reports, the journal has a 2023 impact factor of 0.1.

== Telos Press Publishing ==
Telos Press Publishing was founded by Paul Piccone, the first editor-in-chief of Telos, and is the publisher of both the journal Telos as well as a separate book line. It is based in Candor, New York.
