= Commission on Unalienable Rights =

U.S. State Department commission, 2019–2020

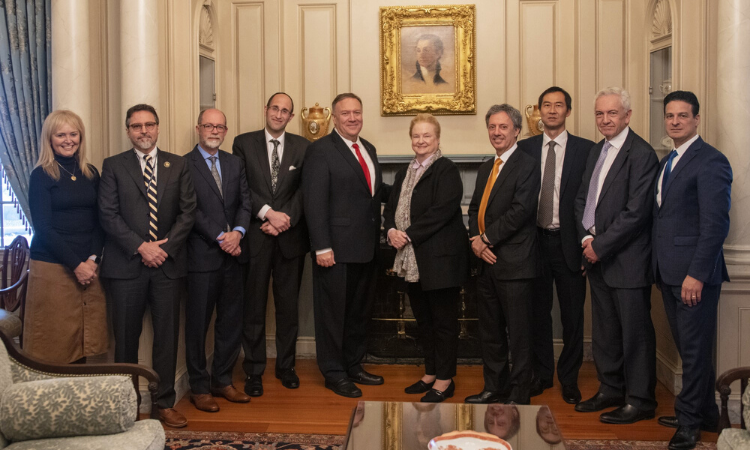
- Mike Pompeo with members of the Commission in October 2019.

Commission overview
- Jurisdiction: U.S. Department of State
- Headquarters: Washington, D.C.
- Commission executive: Mary Ann Glendon, Chair
- Parent department: United States Department of State

The Commission on Unalienable Rights was a commission created under the U.S. State Department in July 2019. It released its final report in August 2020.

== History ==
=== Background ===
In July 2018, the State Department hosted its first annual Ministerial to Advance Religious Freedom. At a Heritage Foundation panel discussion, the Christian conservative attorney Benjamin Bull claimed that the left-wing was using "newly manufactured human rights" (an apparent reference to LGBTQ-related rights) to "crush" the "traditional" and "natural" rights recognized by Christians.

=== Creation and mission ===
On May 30, 2019, the State Department announced its intention to create the commission. The announcement was published in the Federal Register and stated that the commission's purpose was to "provide the Secretary of State advice and recommendations concerning international human rights matters" along with "fresh thinking about human rights discourse where such discourse has departed from our nation's founding principles of natural law and natural rights".

On June 28, 2019, it was reported that Robert P. George, McCormick Professor of Jurisprudence at Princeton University, was involved with the planning of the commission.

On July 7, 2019, then Secretary of State Mike Pompeo published an op-ed in The Wall Street Journal explaining the commission's intended focus. He said that "universal", "unalienable" rights must be distinguished from "ad hoc rights granted by governments". Modern references to "new categories of rights", per Pompeo, aim at "rewarding interest groups and dividing humanity into subgroups". He warned that "loose talk of 'rights' unmoors us from the principles of liberal democracy". Pompeo described that the commission was expected to generate debate over philosophical questions such as: "What are our fundamental freedoms? Why do we have them? Who or what grants these rights? How do we know if a claim of human rights is true? What happens when rights conflict? Should certain categories of rights be inextricably 'linked' to other rights?" The commission was to be designated as an advisory body, rather than as a policy-making body.

The commission's creation was announced on July 8, 2019. According to Pompeo, the mission of the commission was to offer "advice on human rights grounded in our nation's founding principles and the principles of the 1948 Universal Declaration of Human Rights".

The following day, State Department spokesperson Morgan Ortagus gave a press briefing in which she explained that "authoritarian regimes [are] subverting this human rights context" and claimed that the U.N. Human Rights Commission had become "a laughingstock". She added that the new commission would not be "partisan" and did not intend to "create new policy on human rights". She also mentioned that Sam Brownback, the U.S. Ambassador-at-Large for International Religious Freedom, had recently produced an International Religious Freedom Report.

=== Report ===
The commission released its draft report on July 16, 2020. It released its final report on August 26, 2020.

== Members ==
As initially announced on July 8, 2019, the commission had 12 members, including eight men and four women.

The chairperson was Mary Ann Glendon, a former U.S. ambassador to the Vatican who now teaches at Harvard Law School. The rapporteur is F. Cartwright Weiland, who works at the State Department. Kiron Skinner was named as the head of the executive secretary, but she lost her State Department job several weeks later.

The other members are:

- Peter Berkowitz (Hoover Institution)
- Russell Berman (Stanford, Hoover Institution)
- Paolo Carozza (Notre Dame, Political Science and Law)
- Hamza Yusuf Hanson (Zaytuna College)
- Jacqueline Rivers (Seymour Institute)
- Meir Soloveichik (Rabbi, Congregation Shearith Israel)
- Katrina Lantos Swett (Lantos Foundation)
- Christopher Tollefsen (University of South Carolina)
- David Tse-Chien Pan (UC Irvine)

== Reactions ==
=== Support ===
Human rights activist Aaron Rhodes, the former executive director of the International Helsinki Federation for Human Rights, wrote that "Secretary of State Mike Pompeo deserves praise for proposing an Unalienable Rights Commission to help guide American human-rights policy" and that the State Department was accurate in naming natural law and natural rights as "the core foundational principles of human rights".

Walter Russell Mead, founder of center-left think tank New America, wrote in The Wall Street Journal that the commission's report was "a thoughtful and carefully reasoned document that may serve as an important landmark in future debates". He added that the commission's "approach offers more opportunity for constructive diplomacy" than some approaches sought by "many contemporary activists".

In July 2020, the editorial board of The Wall Street Journal issued an editorial in support of the commission's report. The board wrote that the report was fair and historically accurate, noting that the report "discusses at length the way the U.S. failed to live up to its founding promise of unalienable rights—most significantly with slavery and the Jim Crow era—and emphasizes that U.S. credibility in promoting human rights abroad depends on America's example at home." The board added that "Mr. Pompeo's initiative is not the coded theocratic or authoritarian document of his critics' partisan imaginations", but instead "a sensible effort to put American human-rights diplomacy on a more sustainable footing."

In December 2020, Nahdlatul Ulama, the world's largest independent Muslim organization, sent Pompeo a letter stating that the organization has "unreservedly embraced the Report of the Commission on Unalienable Rights" and that the report constitutes a "re-affirmation of the spirit and substance of fundamental human rights".

=== Criticism ===
GLAAD, an LGBTQ rights organization, found that seven members of the commission had made anti-LGBTQ remarks in the past. Joanne Lin, national director of advocacy and government affairs at the human rights organization Amnesty International USA, says that this commission "appears to be an attempt to further hateful policies aimed at women and LGBTQ people." Roger Pilon, chair of Constitutional Studies for the Cato Institute, wrote that, "the distinction between natural law, especially if theologically based, and natural rights to liberty looms large".

On June 12, 2019, Senators Bob Menendez (D-N.J.), Patrick Leahy (D-Vt.), Dick Durbin (D-Ill.), Jeanne Shaheen (D-N.H.), and Chris Coons (D-Del.) wrote to Secretary of State Mike Pompeo to "express our deep concern with the process and intent behind the Department of State's recently announced Commission on Unalienable Rights...With deep reservations about the commission, we request that you not take any further action regarding its membership or proposed operations without first consulting with congressional oversight and appropriations committees." On June 13, 2019, the U.S. House debated an en bloc amendment which included a provision to defund the commission. On June 18, 2019, the U.S. House voted 231–187 in favor of the en bloc amendment. Not long after the establishment of the commission major human rights organizations warned that the commission could cause significant harm to the global human rights system. In May 2020, 167 rights advocates and organizations from 28 different countries put out a statement expressing "grave concern" about the direction of the commission and urged it to "reject the prioritization of freedom of religion as a cloak to permit violations of the human rights of women, girls, and lesbian, gay, bisexual and transgender (LGBT) people."

After the release of the commission's final report, former U.S. Deputy Secretary of State Rori Kramer criticized the commission and in an interview with The Guardian, saying that "[f]rom day one when Pompeo announced this, the intention was always to change the actual working policy of the department to fit his narrow religious views in a way that really upends the normal working order of the department." Miguel H. Díaz, former United States Ambassador to the Holy See joined by 125 Catholic theologians and leaders, signed a public petition which, among other things, expresses concern that the commission's composition indicated that it was poised to lead to policies that will "harm people who are already vulnerable, especially poor women, children, LGBTI people, immigrants, refugees, and those in need of reproductive health services."

In addition to political leaders and human rights organizations, the commission's report saw opposition from a large number of human rights advocates and scholars. Notable ones include Kenneth Roth, the executive director of Human Rights Watch, who described the commission's report as "a frontal assault on international human rights law." Gerald L. Neuman, Director of the Human Rights Program at Harvard Law School and a former member of the United Nations Human Rights Committee, who had previously submitted formal comments to the commission outlining its defects, was joined by Martha Minow (former Dean of Harvard Law School), Mathias Risse (Director of the Carr Center for Human Rights Policy at Harvard University), and Katharine Young (Professor of Law at Boston College Law School) in criticizing the report. Gerald L. Neuman and Katharine Young also published more extensive academic contributions in connection with the report and related topics.

== See also ==
- 1776 Commission
- Geneva Consensus Declaration
