= Public ecology =

The idea of public ecology has recently emerged in response to increasing disparities over political, social, and environmental concerns. Of particular interest are the processes that generate, evaluate and apply knowledge in political, social, and environmental arenas. Public ecology offers a way of framing sustainability problems, community dynamics and social issues. Forests, watersheds, parks, flora, fauna, air, and water all constitute environmental quality and are therefore public goods. The processes society engages in to negotiate the meaning of these goods, upon which decisions and actions are based, reside within the public domain.

== Dynamics ==
The boundaries that are ascribed to both social and ecological systems are permeable and dynamic. The creation and maintenance of these boundaries should not be exclusionary. Politicians, economists, and ecologists must work with citizens across cultural, organizational, institutional, political and geographic boundaries. However, which citizens should be involved, and how they should be involved are questions that need to be addressed.

Knowledge bases, roles of experts, and state and local power dynamics are changing in ways that impel us to learn new ways of coexisting. A more public ecology could take many forms and exist in many forums, some of which are currently being explored through theory and practice. Adaptive Management, citizen science (Backstrand 2003), ecological real-world experiments (Gross & Hoffmann-Riem 2005), and Collaborative Ecosystem Governance (Karkkainen 2002) are examples of evolving processes that attempt to deal with the increasing complexity and dynamism of social and ecological systems. Governance of these systems must integrate both biological and social dimensions. Competing value claims will inevitably arise and lead to conflicts that must be addressed through an inclusive, deliberative and adaptive process. An understanding of ecosystems must consider and dignify the values of affected communities and not just rely on claims made by scientific experts.

== Main organizing principles ==
- Promotes a blending of natural with the social that goes beyond naturalism and environmental science
- Seeks integrative collaborative processes that cross the many disciplinary and cultural boundaries

that separate scientists, policy-makers, and citizens

- Explores dimensions, qualities, and aspects of the world that are public and driven by normative

claims

- Supports respect for the various value systems that shape political discourse at local, regional, and national scales
- Values local decision making that is embedded in the larger context of protecting public goods
- Recognizes the need for local knowledge and local action to address local concerns in a more

inclusive and pluralist process

- Considers local decision making embedded in a larger context of protecting public goods

(Adapted from David Robertson, Bruce Hull and Timothy Luke)

Many of these principles are shared or have roots in disciplines such as political ecology, sustainable development, urban ecology, conservation biology and restoration ecology. Public Ecology also shares a common interdisciplinary and holistic approach to social-environmental interactions with Human Ecology.

== Quotes ==
“The challenge today is how to develop a truly public ecology with new organizations, institutions, and ideas whose material articulation can balance the insights of scientific experts, the concerns of private property holders, the worries about social inequity, and the need for ecological sustainability to support human and nonhuman life in the 21st century.” (Luke 2005)

“Public ecology is distinctive in that it explicitly and critically embraces its own normativity and uncertainty while striving to create a more democratic body of knowledge that will help us to understand the environment as a complex and dynamic biocultural system, one that can be interpreted from a variety of perspectives and points of view. Public ecology encourages citizens and all concerned stakeholders to participate with research scientists and professional policy-makers in the interdisciplinary, collaborative efforts necessary to resolve the uncertainty and conflict that surrounds contemporary environmental issues.” (Robertson and Hull 2003)

“Public ecology is a more powerful ecology. It is a body of environmental knowledge that seeks to bridge the gulf between science and policy. Public ecology not only exists at the interface of science and policy but functions as a joint product of these generally disparate realms. The language of public ecology facilitates the flow of ideas and information form one side to the other and back again.” (Robertson and Hull 2001)
