= Telos Institute =

Non-profit organization associated with the journal Telos

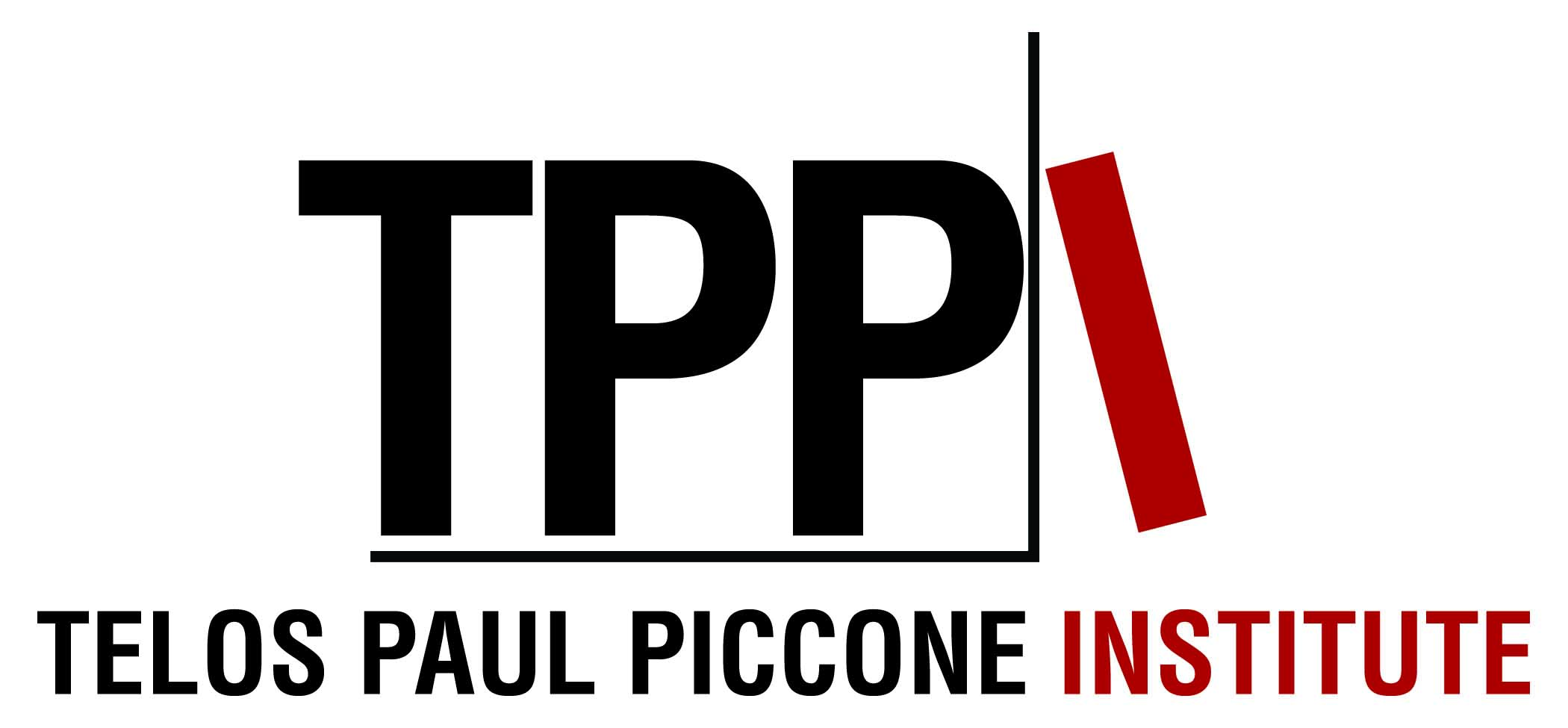

The Telos-Paul Piccone Institute (TPPI) is a 501(c) non-profit organization created in 2006 and incorporated in 2012 in memory of Italian-American philosopher and social theorist Paul Piccone, the founding editor of the scholarly journal Telos. The institute "develops new ideas for addressing the challenges of modernity worldwide through the resources of particular communities and traditions." Its board president is Russell A. Berman.

== Conferences ==
The institute holds annual conferences in New York based around a single theme, and it has held additional conferences in Europe and Asia.

== Other initiatives ==
TPPI has been structured to advance a series of rotating, long-term intellectual initiatives. Its current initiatives concern China, Israel, and modern political economy.

The institute supports the translation of works of critical theory and other writings of interest to its community through its translation grant program.

== Relation to Telos ==
TPPI shares historical roots with the journal Telos, in the name of whose founding editor, Paul Piccone, the institute was created. Although they cooperate on the publication of papers presented at TPPI conferences, the two organizations are independent from one another and pursue separate missions.

== See also ==
- Telos
