= Russell Berman =

American academic and professor (born 1950)

Russell A. Berman (born May 14, 1950) is an American academic and professor specializing in German studies and Comparative literature. He serves as the Walter A. Haas Professor in the Humanities at Stanford University. He is also a senior fellow at the Hoover Institution. He is the director of Stanford's Thinking Matters program. He previously served as associate dean and director of Stanford's Overseas Studies Program.

== Early life and career ==
Born in Boston, Massachusetts, Berman received a Bachelor of Arts degree from Harvard University in 1972 and completed a doctorate at Washington University in St. Louis in 1979. Since 1979, Berman has been on the faculty at Stanford University. In 2004, he became the editor of Telos, a quarterly journal of critical theory which has included extensive discussions of the Frankfurt School as well as Carl Schmitt. In 2011, he served as president of the Modern Language Association (MLA).

Together with his colleague David Tse-Chien Pan, he served on the U.S. State Department's Commission on Unalienable Rights convened by Secretary of State Mike Pompeo and led by Harvard professor Mary Ann Glendon.

== Selected bibliography ==
- Between Fontane and Tucholsky: Literary Criticism and the Public Sphere in Imperial Germany (New York: Lang, 1983)
- The Rise of the Modern German Novel: Crisis and Charisma (Cambridge, MA: Harvard University Press, 1986) - Outstanding Book in German Studies Award of the German Studies Association, 1988.
- Modern Culture and Critical Theory: Art, Politics, and the Legacy of the Frankfurt School (Madison: University of Wisconsin Press, 1989)
- Cultural Studies of Modern Germany: History, Representation, and Nationhood (Madison: University of Wisconsin Press, 1993)
- "Culture in the Conservative Revolution: The American Debate." Telos 101, Fall 1994.
- Enlightenment or Empire: Colonial Discourse in German Culture (Lincoln: University of Nebraska Press, 1998) - Outstanding Book in German Studies Award of the German Studies Association, 2000.
- Anti-Americanism in Europe: A Cultural Problem (Stanford, CA: Hoover Institution Press, 2004)
- Fiction Sets You Free: On Literature In History (Iowa City: University of Iowa Press, 2007)
- "Representing the Trial: Judith Butler Reads Hannah Arendt Reading Adolf Eichmann" in Fathom Journal, Spring (2015)
