= Paul Piccone =

Italian American philosopher (1940–2004)

Paul Piccone (Italian: [pikˈkoːne]; January 17, 1940 – July 12, 2004) was an Italian-American philosopher, critical theorist, intellectual historian, and most notably the founder and long-time editor of the journal Telos.

He was born in L'Aquila in Italy to a family that emigrated to Rochester, New York in the mid-1950s. In 1968, he and others started the journal Telos, which he edited until his death in 2004.

He completed a doctorate in philosophy at the University at Buffalo (State University of New York) in 1970. He then taught at Washington University in St. Louis until 1977.

== Life ==
Piccone was born in L'Aquila, Italy on January 17, 1940. He immigrated to the United States with his family at age 14, and they settled in Rochester, New York. After undergraduate studies at Indiana University Bloomington, he did his doctoral work in philosophy at the University at Buffalo where he received his Ph.D. in 1970. He was appointed to a position in the Department of Sociology at Washington University in St. Louis, and published Telos from his office there until he was denied promotion and tenure in 1977. Following a tumultuous administrative and legal struggle to reverse that decision, he left the Midwest to set up shop in New York's East Village in the 1980s.

=== Telos ===
For over three decades, Telos survived as an independent "quarterly journal of critical thought" under his editorship. Selected articles by Piccone are available from the Telos online store. During the 1980’s the journal moved away from its former left political orientation.

== Death ==
Not long after turning 60, Piccone contracted a rare form of cancer during 2000. He battled it successfully for many long months, but on July 12, 2004, he died at age 64.

== Bibliography ==
=== Books ===
- Towards a New Marxism, Paul Piccone and Bart Grahl, eds. (St. Louis, Missouri: Telos Press, 1973).
- Italian Marxism, Paul Piccone (Berkeley: University of California Press, 1983).
- Confronting the Crisis: Writings of Paul Piccone, Paul Piccone, ed. and intro. by Gary Ulmen (New York: Telos Press, 2008). ISBN 978-0-914386-38-4

== See also ==
- Telos Institute
