= Paolo G. Carozza =

American legal scholar

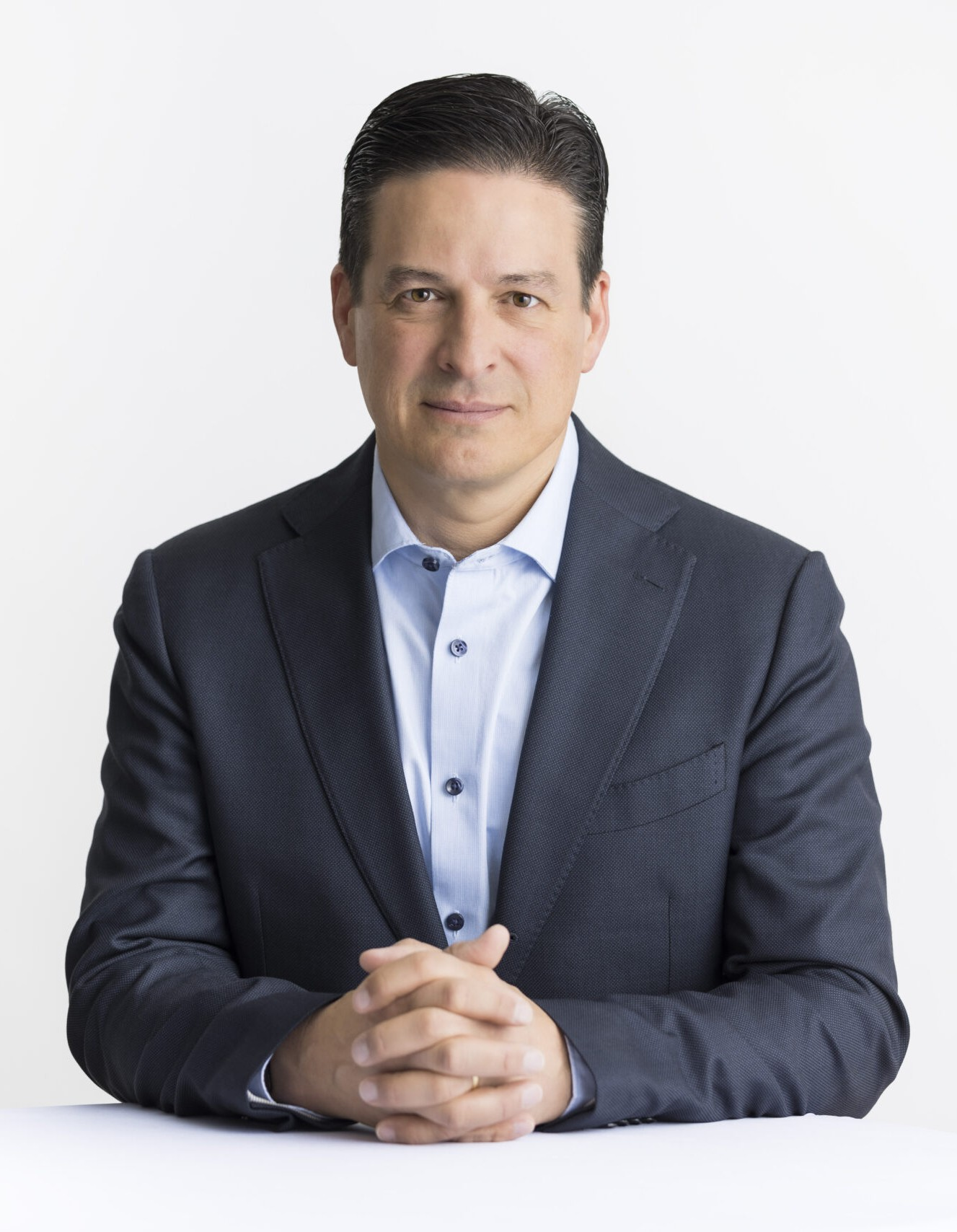
- Born: June 4, 1963 (age 63); Washington, D.C.
- Education: Harvard University (BA, JD)
- Occupation: Professor of Law
- Employer: University of Notre Dame

Paolo Giovanni Carozza (born 1963 in Washington D.C.) is a professor of law at the University of Notre Dame, working on human rights, comparative law, and international law. He has made contributions to the field of law through his research, teaching, public service, and advocacy.

== Early life and education ==
Carozza was born in 1963 to Italian immigrant parents and spent his childhood in Milwaukee, Wisconsin, where his parents were professors of comparative literature, Italian, and French at the University of Wisconsin-Milwaukee and Marquette University.

He completed an interdisciplinary honors major in Social Studies at Harvard College and was awarded a Charles Henry Fiske III Fellowship to spend a year in residence at Trinity College, Cambridge University. Carozza later attended Harvard Law School, where he studied under Professor Mary Ann Glendon, and developed his interests in human rights and comparative law. At Harvard law, Carozza spent his summers doing human rights work in Haiti and working for a law firm in Paris.

== Academic career at Notre Dame ==
Carozza joined the Notre Dame Law School faculty in 1996, where he has taught human rights, comparative law, international business transactions, public international law, comparative constitutional law, and jurisprudence. He received tenure in 2003. From 2012 to 2022, he served as the director of the Kellogg Institute for International Studies.

He has also been involved with the Notre Dame Global Human Rights Clinic, the Klau Institute for Civil and Human Rights, the Kroc Institute for International Peace Studies, the Nanovic Institute for European Studies, the Notre Dame Institute for Educational Initiatives, and the Notre Dame Religious Liberty Initiative.

== Professional and advisory roles ==
Carozza is the Co-Chair of the Oversight Board created by Meta Platforms Inc., addressing online content moderation issues and policy guidance. He served as the United States member of the European Commission for Democracy through Law (Venice Commission) from 2019 to 2024, where he was elected to its executive board and contributed as a rapporteur for various opinions from countries including Chile, Poland, Hungary, Turkey, Bosnia and Herzegovina, and Kyrgyzstan. He also served on the U.S. State Department's nonpartisan and independent Commission on Unalienable Rights. From 2006 to 2010, he was a member of the Inter-American Commission on Human Rights, serving as its president in 2008-2009. During his tenure, he was the rapporteur for the Rights of Indigenous Peoples, for Human Rights Defenders, and Peru, Chile, Panama, Paraguay, and others, and as president oversaw significant procedural reforms.

== Honors and recognitions ==
Paolo Carozza has received the Order of Merit of Bernardo O'Higgins from Chile, awarded by President Michelle Bachelet in recognition of his contributions to the Inter-American human rights system, honorary doctorates from Pázmány Péter Catholic University and the Dominican School of Philosophy and Theology (DSPT), where he has since served as a member of the DSPT College of Fellows.

In recognition of his scholarly work which exemplifies social justice and his service to the University of Notre Dame and the wider academic community, Paolo Carozza received the 2019 Reinhold Niebuhr Award and the 2023 Notre Dame faculty award.

He is the recipient of two U.S. Fulbright awards, as senior lecturer (2004, University of Milan) and Senior Research Scholar (2011, University of Florence). In 2016, he was appointed by Pope Francis to the Pontifical Academy of Social Sciences. In 2024 he was selected to be a member of the American Academy of Sciences and Letters.

== Publications and research ==
Carozza has authored publications in comparative constitutional law, human rights, law and development, and international law. His research addresses the foundational principles of the international human rights system, such as human dignity and subsidiarity, and the relationship between universal principles of human rights and the diversity of legal traditions. More recently, Carozza's work has focused on issues relating to the regulation of social media and emerging technologies, and the effects of new technologies on law and other social institutions.

== Teaching and mentorship ==
At Notre Dame Law School, Carozza served as the director of the Center for Civil and Human Rights and its LL.M. program in international human rights law, and directed the law school's J.S.D. Program for over 12 years.

Carozza has taught as a visiting professor as the John Harvey Gregory Lecturer in World Organization at Harvard Law School. He also taught annual courses at the Alta Scuola di Economia e Relazioni Internazionali (ASERI) of the Catholic University of the Sacred Heart in Milan, Italy.
