= David Tse-Chien Pan =

American philosopher (born 1963)

- Born: 1963 (age 62–63)

Education
- Education: Stanford University (BA in English and German); Columbia University (MA in Germanic languages, PhD)

Philosophical work
- Era: 21st-century philosophy
- Region: Western philosophy
- Institutions: University of California, Irvine
- Main interests: German literature

David Tse-Chien Pan (born 1963) is an American literary scholar and professor of German at the University of California, Irvine. He is known for his works on German literature and intellectual history. Pan was a member of the Commission on Unalienable Rights. In 2024, he was the Republican candidate for U.S. representative of California's 46th congressional district.

== Books ==
- Sacrifice in the Modern World: On the Particularity and Generality of Nazi Myth, Evanston: Northwestern University Press, 2012. 184 pp.
- Kleists Erzählungen und Dramen: Neue Studien. Edited with Paul Michael Lützeler. Würzburg: Königshausen und Neumann, 2001. 263 pp.
- Primitive Renaissance: Rethinking German Expressionism. Lincoln: University of Nebraska Press, 2001. 239 pp.
