= Mary Ann Glendon =

American diplomat (born 1938)

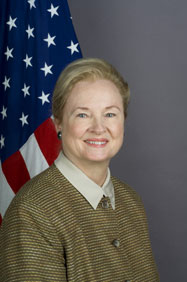
- Official portrait, 2008

8th United States Ambassador to the Holy See
- In office February 29, 2008 – January 19, 2009
- President: George W. Bush
- Preceded by: Francis Rooney
- Succeeded by: Miguel Díaz

Personal details
- Born: October 7, 1938 (age 88) Pittsfield, Massachusetts, U.S.
- Party: Independent
- Education: Mount Holyoke College (attended); University of Chicago (BA, JD, MCL)

Mary Ann Glendon (born October 7, 1938) is the Learned Hand Professor of Law Emerita at Harvard Law School and a former United States Ambassador to the Holy See. She teaches and writes on bioethics, comparative constitutional law, property, and human rights in international law.

== Early life and education ==
Glendon was raised in Dalton, Massachusetts. Her father, Martin Glendon, an Irish-Catholic Democrat, was a reporter for the Berkshire Eagle and also chaired the local board of selectmen.

Glendon received her Bachelor of Arts, J.D., and Master of Comparative Law from the University of Chicago.

== Legal and Academic Career ==
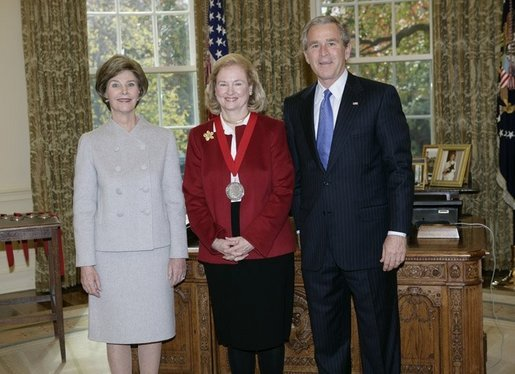
President George W. Bush and Laura Bush stand with 2005 National Humanities Medal recipient Mary Ann Glendon.

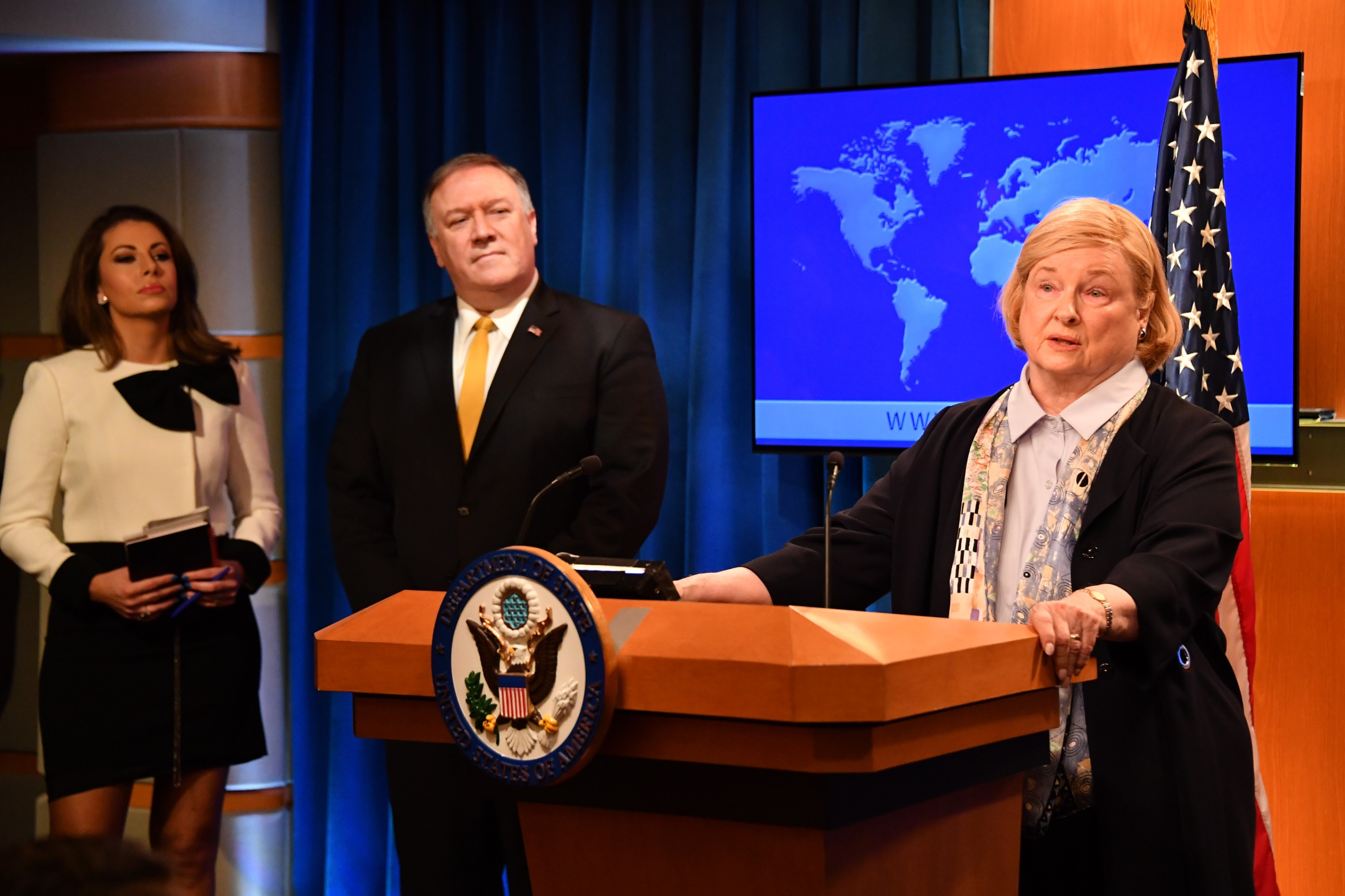
Glendon delivers remarks to the press at the U.S. Department of State in Washington, D.C., on July 8, 2019.

Glendon practiced law in Chicago from 1963 to 1968. For a time, she was an associate of the firm of Mayer Brown. She became a professor at Boston College Law School in 1968 and began teaching at Harvard Law School in 1987. Glendon is a former president of the International Association of Legal Science. In 2002, President Bush appointed Glendon to the President's Council on Bioethics. Glendon received the National Humanities Medal in 2005. Glendon was a mentor of Mike Pompeo, the former United States Secretary of State, when Pompeo was at Harvard Law School. Pompeo appointed Glendon as Chair of the newly formed State Department's Commission on Unalienable Rights in July 2019 to re-examine the role of human rights in U.S. foreign policy.

== Church Work ==
In 1995, she was the Vatican representative to the international 1995 Beijing Conference on Women sponsored by the United Nations, where she contested the use of condoms for the prevention of HIV and AIDS. At the time, Pope John Paul II issued a statement that "The Holy See in no way endorses contraception or the use of condoms, either as a family planning measure or in HIV/AIDS prevention programs." Glendon has also served on the Pontifical Council for the Laity, and as president of the Pontifical Academy of Social Sciences (PASS). When Glendon was appointed president of PASS, she became the first woman to head a Pontifical academy.

On November 4, 2002, in reference to the Boston Globe's Pulitzer Prize nomination for its coverage of sexual abuse by Catholic priests, Glendon told a conference of Catholics that "if fairness and accuracy have anything to do with it, awarding the Pulitzer Prize to the Boston Globe would be like giving the Nobel Peace Prize to Osama bin Laden." In 2003 the Globe was awarded the Pulitzer Prize for Public Service for its coverage of the church scandals.

The Bush nomination announced that it had nominated Glendon as United States Ambassador to the Holy See on November 5, 2007. The U.S. Senate voted to confirm her on December 19, 2007. She presented her Letters of Credence to Pope Benedict XVI on February 29, 2008, and resigned her office effective January 19, 2009.

Glendon was selected by the University of Notre Dame as the 2009 recipient of the school's Laetare Medal but declined the award due to the university's decision to host Barack Obama as its commencement speaker and bestow upon him an honorary degree, which was seen as controversial by some. In light of Obama's pro-choice policies, Glendon considered Notre Dame's decision to be in violation of the United States Conference of Catholic Bishops' 2004 pronouncement that Catholic institutions should not give "awards, honors, or platforms" to "those who act in defiance of [Catholic] fundamental moral principles." Glendon also felt that the university was implicitly trying to use her acceptance speech to give the appearance of balance to the event and expressed concern about the "ripple effect" Notre Dame's disregard of the USCCB pronouncement is having on the nation's other Catholic schools.

On June 26, 2013, Pope Francis named Glendon a member of the Pontifical Commission of inquiry for the Institute for Works of Religion (IOR), which is also known as the Vatican Bank. Glendon, two cardinals, a bishop, and a monsignor are responsible for preparing an investigative report on the Vatican Bank. In July 2014 she was appointed to be a member of the board of the IOR. Glendon resigned from the board in February 2018 saying that she wanted to devote more time to other Catholic causes.

Glendon has served on the board of directors for First Things, an ecumenical conservative journal that encourages a religiously informed philosophy for the ordering of society. Glendon has been a frequent contributor to First Things. She is also a board member of Blackstone Fellowship the Christian conservative legal training program run by Alliance Defending Freedom.

On October 1, 2017, it was announced that Glendon would be the 2018 recipient of the Notre Dame Center for Ethics and Culture's Evangelium Vitae Medal.

In 2024, she published a memoir, In the Courts of Three Popes: An American Lawyer and Diplomat in the Last Absolute Monarchy of the West.

== Politics ==
During the 1960 presidential election, the first in which Glendon could vote, she cast her ballot for John F. Kennedy. For most of her early life she was a Democrat. She later found both the Democratic and Republican parties unwelcoming, and became an independent.

Glendon supported Mitt Romney in the 2012 presidential election. She also supported Romney's campaign in the 2008 presidential election.

== Personal life ==
In 1964, Glendon contracted a civil marriage with an attorney and settled in Chicago. They divorced in 1966. In 1970, she married Edward R. Lev, a labor lawyer. Glendon and Lev remained together until Lev's death in 2013. Glendon has three daughters.

== See also ==
- George W. Bush Supreme Court candidates

Diplomatic posts
| Preceded by Francis Rooney | United States Ambassador to the Holy See; 2008–2009 | Succeeded by Miguel Díaz |
