= CPAS =

CPAS may refer to:

- Centre for the Public Awareness of Science
- Central Procurement Accounting System, logistics and supply chain management system for the United States Air Force
- Chinese Public Administration Society
- Church Pastoral Aid Society, an Anglican evangelical mission agency
- Collaborative Process Automation Systems
- Centre public d'action sociale, the French term for the Public Centre for Social Welfare in Belgium
- Comité Pro Acción Sindical, a Guatemalan trade union federation
