= Ronaldo Lemos =

Brazilian academic

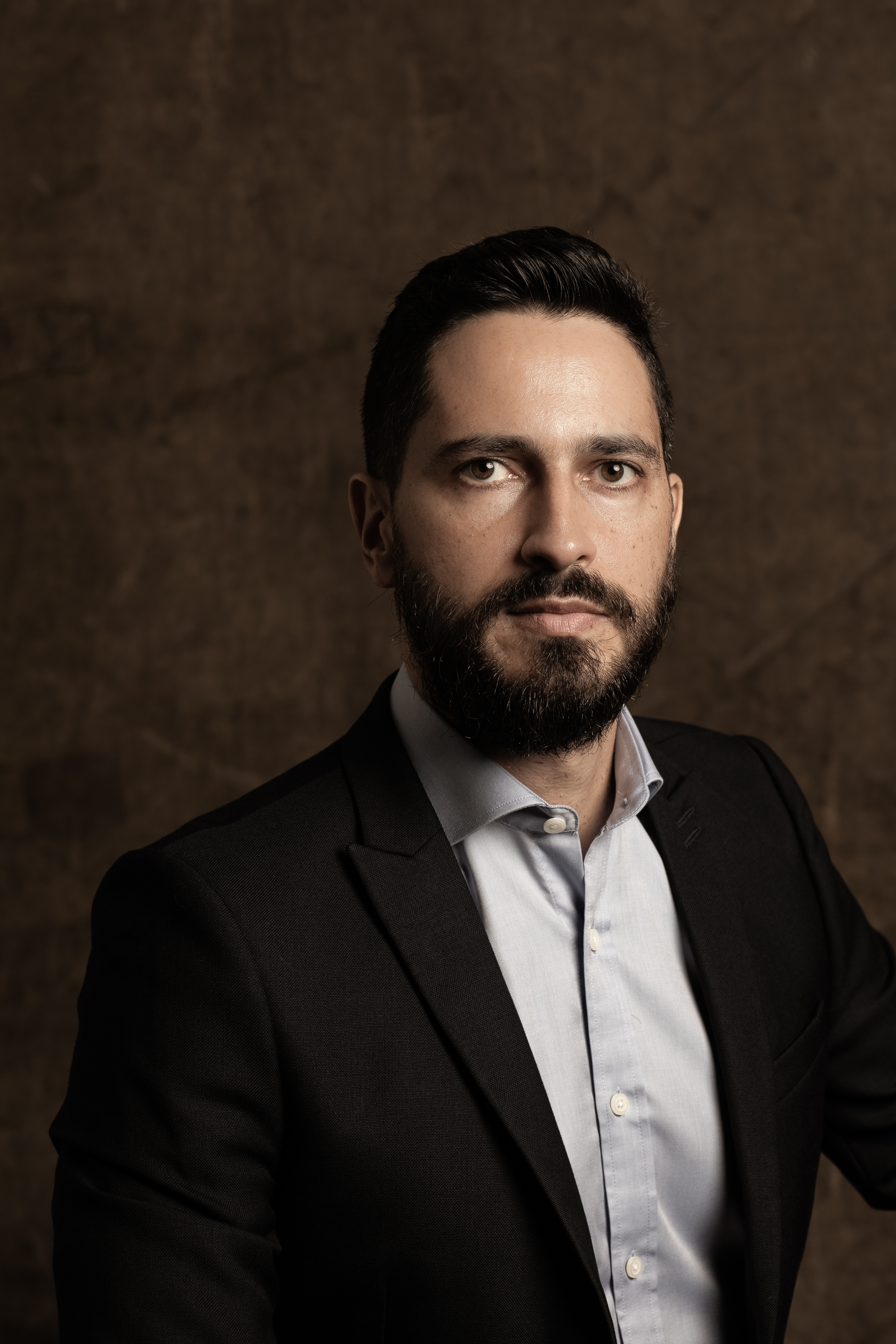
- Lemos in 2020
- Born: Ronaldo Lemos da Silva Júnior; March 25, 1976 (age 50); Araguari, Minas Gerais, Brazil
- Occupations: Lawyer; professor; researcher; television host
- Known for: Creator of the idea of the Marco Civil da Internet; Co-authored of the Brazilian National Internet of Things Plan; Architect of Brazil's first state-level Artificial Intelligence law; Member of the Oversight Board; Project Lead for Creative Commons Brazil

Ronaldo Lemos (Araguari, March 25, 1976) is a Brazilian lawyer specializing in technology, professor, researcher, and television host, internationally recognized for his work on intellectual property, data privacy, artificial intelligence, media, public policy, and innovation.

He was the creator and leading advocate of the Brazilian Civil Rights Framework for the Internet, (Marco Civil da Internet) the first comprehensive law on technology and the internet in Brazil. He is also one of the most prominent figures in the regulatory development of the internet in the country. He co-authored the Brazilian National Internet of Things Plan, and led the drafting of the country's first comprehensive legislation on artificial intelligence, Complementary Law No. 205/2025 of the State of Goiás.

He holds a Master of Laws degree from Harvard University and both a Bachelor's and a PhD in Law from the University of São Paulo (USP). He founded the Institute for Technology and Society of Rio de Janeiro (ITS Rio), where he currently serves as Chief Scientist. He has been Professor of Technology and Public Policy at Columbia University in New York, at the School of International and Public Affairs (SIPA), and Full Professor of Technology at Schwarzman College of Tsinghua University, in Beijing. In Brazil, he served as Professor of Computer Law at the Rio de Janeiro State University (UERJ) and Full Professor of Intellectual Property at the Rio de Janeiro Law School of Fundação Getulio Vargas (FGV), of which he was one of the founders. He was also a visiting researcher and the representative of the MIT Media Lab in Brazil, in addition to being a visiting researcher at Princeton and Oxford universities.

He has served on the boards of several organizations, including the Mozilla Foundation, Access Now, and German Hospital Oswaldo Cruz. He currently sits on the Spotify Safety Advisory Council, Meta's Oversight Board, the Stellar Development Foundation Board, and the Board of the Museum of Tomorrow, among others.

He is a weekly columnist and member of the Editorial Board of Folha de S.Paulo one of Brazil's most prominent newspapers. He is also the creator and host of Expresso Futuro, a documentary series on innovation and technology broadcast weekly by Futura Channel and also aired by Fantástico on TV Globo.

Lemos has worked in television across multiple networks and published books on various topics, including law, technology, and culture. He has also served as curator of the Tim Festival, a music festival held between (2005–2008), and is currently curator of the C6 Fest.

In 2015, he was named one of the Young Global Leaders by the World Economic Forum and became a fellow of Ashoka. He is also a practicing lawyer, leading the technology practice at Rennó Penteado Sampaio Advogados. He served as president of the Technology Committee of the São Paulo Bar Association (OAB-SP).

His work includes collaborations with organizations and companies around the world, including the incorporation of technologies into public administration.

== Main Legislative Contributions in Brazil ==
=== Marco Civil da Internet ===
Recognized as the creator and main advocate of the Brazilian Civil Rights Framework for the Internet (Marco Civil da Internet), Ronaldo Lemos played a central role in the initiative that led to the legal regulation of users' rights and responsibilities on the internet in Brazil, through Law No. 12,965/2014. In 2007, he established a partnership with the Secretariat for Legislative Affairs of the Ministry of Justice, through which he developed an innovative model of public participation in the drafting of legislation via online public consultations. Based on contributions received during the public consultation process between 2009 and 2010, he drafted the first version of the bill, which was later enacted in 2014.

=== First Artificial Intelligence Law in Brazil, State of Goiás ===
Lemos led the drafting of the first state and country-level legislation on artificial intelligence in Brazil, approved in May 2025 by the State of Goiás. The proposal was developed through a public consultation coordinated by the Institute for Technology and Society of Rio de Janeiro (ITS Rio) and Abranet, with Lemos serving as the chief coordinator. Key points of the new law include prioritization of open source AI models, the integration of AI education into public school curricula, and incentives for the use of renewable energy in data center operations.

=== Rare Earths and Critical Minerals Law of the State of Goiás ===
He was the architect and driving force behind the law on rare earth elements, critical minerals, and remineralizers approved by the State of Goiás (Law No. 23,597/2025). The legislation established the State Authority for Critical Minerals (AMIC/GO). Considering Goiás’ abundance of rare earth elements and critical minerals such as niobium, neodymium, dysprosium, yttrium, among others, the law implemented tools for the strategic development of these resources. Among them are the creation of the State Fund for the Development of Critical Minerals (FEDMC), the establishment of Special Zones for Critical Mineral Mining (ZEMCs), and the financing of technological innovation and local infrastructure projects.

=== National Internet of Things Plan ===
In 2016, in partnership with McKinsey & Company and the Center for Research and Development in Telecommunications (CPqD), Lemos initiated actions to formalize Brazil's National Internet of Things Plan. The project was carried out through an agreement between the National Bank for Economic and Social Development (NBESD) and the Ministry of Science, Technology, Innovation and Communications (MCTI). The resulting report, co-authored by Lemos, was published in May 2018 on the NBESD website and, after being submitted to the Office of the Chief of Staff, was established by Decree No. 9,854/2019.

=== General Data Protection Law (LGPD) ===
Lemos was actively involved in advocating for the implementation of Brazil's General Personal Data Protection Law (Lei Geral de Proteção de Dados Pessoais – LGPD), a proposal originally conceived by professor and lawyer Danilo Doneda. He coordinated the academic team that supported the federal government in collecting public input on the bill, which was ultimately enacted in 2018.

=== Creative Commons Licenses ===
In 2004, Lemos led the project that introduced Creative Commons licensing in Brazil, providing creators with various options for licensing their intellectual property. He was responsible for translating and adapting version 2.0 of the licenses to Brazilian law, making Brazil the third country in the world to adopt the model. In 2010, he also translated and formalized version 3.0 of the licenses.

=== Free Software Licenses for the Federal Government ===
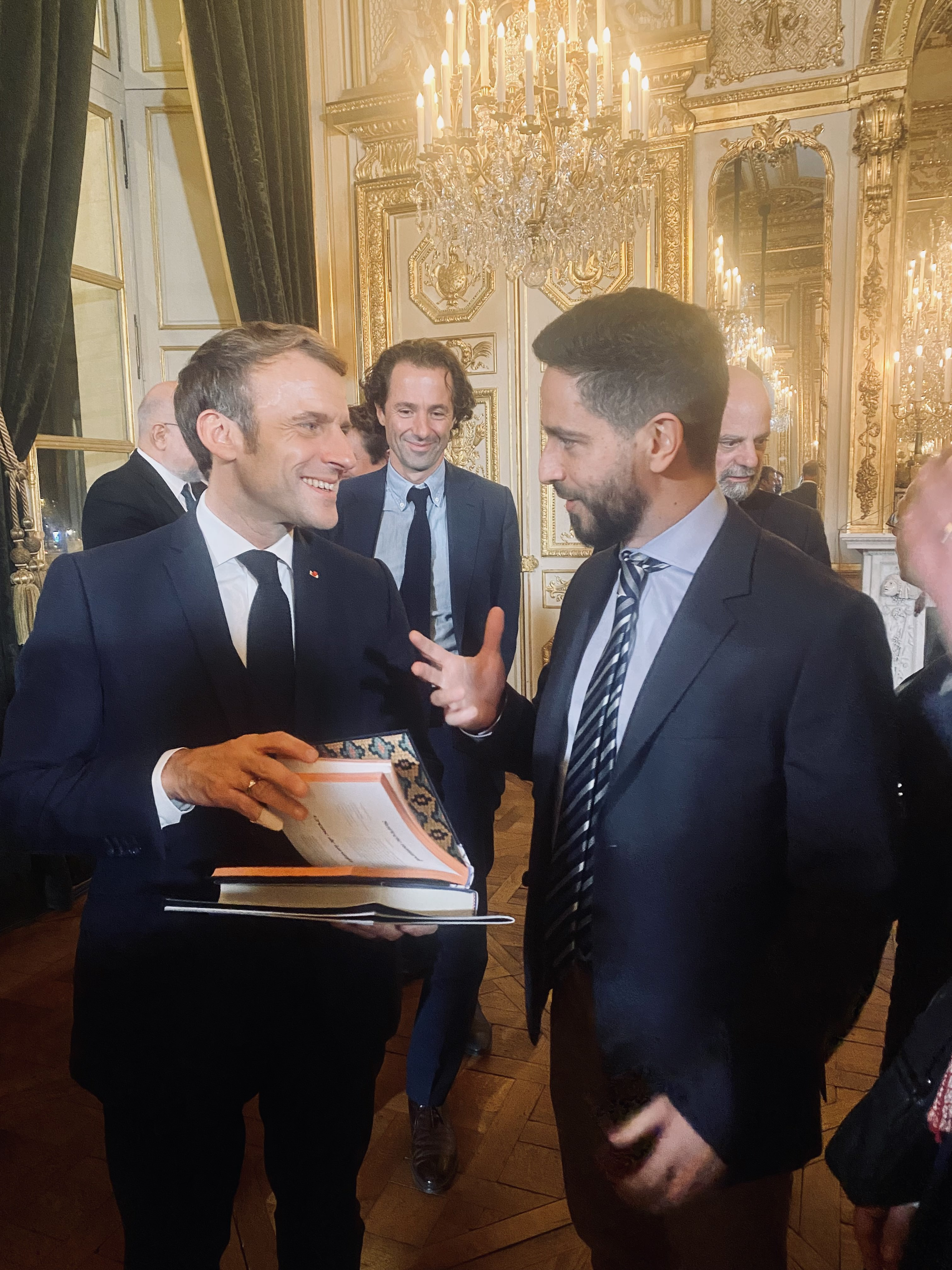
Emmanuel Macron and Ronaldo Lemos in 2021 at the Élysée Palace

Also in 2004, Lemos contributed to the development of licensing models used by the Brazilian federal government for free software. Through an agreement between the Free Software Foundation and the National Institute of Information Technology, he translated and adapted the Free Software Foundation's licenses to Portuguese and integrated them with Creative Commons licenses. This unprecedented development led to the creation of hybrid licenses CC-GNU-GPL and CC-GNU-LGPL, which formed the legal basis for free and public software initiatives in Brazil.

=== Copyright Law Reform ===
Lemos drafted the bill on collective copyright management that was incorporated into the final report of the Parliamentary Commission of Inquiry on ECAD (the Central Bureau for Collection and Distribution). The process resulted in the enactment of Law No. 12,853/2013, which amended Brazil's Copyright Law. Among the provisions of the new law are increased oversight of ECAD by trade associations and public bodies, and expanded accountability regarding rightsholders over their works.

=== Mudamos Platform ===
Through ITS Rio, Lemos created the digital platform Mudamos, which enabled citizens to digitally sign bills of popular initiative. The goal was to simplify the collection of signatures required for such bills to be submitted to legislative bodies. The platform served both as a repository for legislative proposals and as a tool for digital signature collection.

== Media contributions ==
=== Newspapers, magazines, and news portals ===
Ronaldo Lemos has been a contributor to Folha de S.Paulo since 2004, becoming a columnist for the newspaper in June 2009. Since then, his column has focused on issues related to technology.

In 2006, he began contributing to Trip Magazine, where he maintained a monthly column on technology, behavior, and culture until March 2020, when the magazine was discontinued.

Lemos has also contributed to several other outlets, including Harper's Bazaar, Consultor Jurídico, JOTA, Observatório da Imprensa, and Foreign Affairs.

=== TV ===
On television, Lemos worked for a decade as a technology commentator on the program Estúdio i on GloboNews, joining the team from the show's debut in 2008.

In 2011, he debuted as a tv host on MTV Brasil, hosting two seasons of the program Mod MTV, recorded in New York and focused on technological trends.

Between 2013 and 2015, he was part of the team of hosts of the weekly program Navegador on GloboNews. In a roundtable format, the show promoted debates on innovation from cultural, technological, political, and social perspectives, with the participation of Alê Youssef, José Marcelo Zacchi, and Hermano Vianna.

During this period, Lemos also worked as a co-writer and regularly appeared on the program Esquenta! on TV Globo, where he gained recognition in 2014 with the segment O que queremos para o Brasil ("What We Want for Brazil").

Since 2017, Ronaldo Lemos has hosted Expresso Futuro, a documentary series on technology and innovation broadcast annually on Futura Channel, with selected seasons also aired on Fantástico. Conceived and written by him, the program follows Lemos on trips across different countries and continents in search of major emerging technological and cultural trends. Within this context, the show anticipated, for example, discussions on instant payments and business models based on live streaming, even before these became a reality. Expresso Futuro has received international recognition, winning the TAL Award and the Gold Panda, an honor equivalent to the Emmy Awards in China.

== Public Appointments and Board Memberships ==
=== Appointments ===
In July 2003, he was appointed by the Secretariat of Economic Law and designated by the Brazilian Ministry of Justice as one of the four inaugural members of the Consumer Protection Commission for Electronic Commerce.

On December 30, 2006, he was named president of the global organization iCommons during a board meeting held in Berlin. He remained in the position for a two-year term.

On August 8, 2012, he was appointed a full member of the Social Communication Council, representing civil society in the body's third composition as an organ of the Brazilian National Congress.

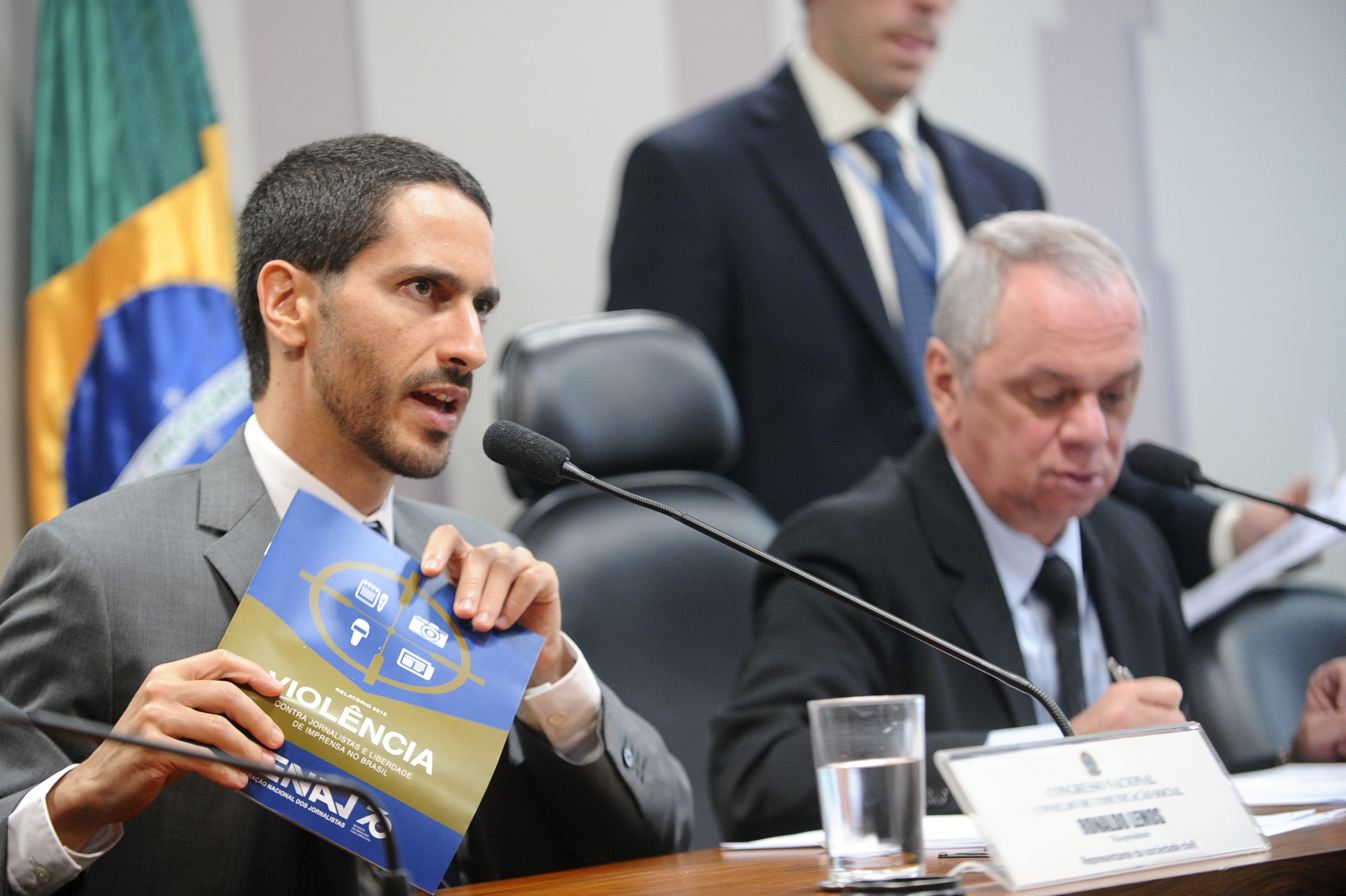
Ronaldo Lemos, in his capacity as Vice President of the Social Communication Council, and President Miguel Ângelo Cançado during a public hearing held in 2015

On May 6, 2013, he was announced as Brazil's representative at the MIT Media Lab. He worked on research promoted by the Center for Civic Media.

In January 2015, he was recognized as a Young Global Leader at the World Economic Forum in Davos, Switzerland.

On July 15 of the same year, he was reappointed to the Social Communication Council for a second term, assuming the vice presidency for the biennium.

Also in 2015, he became a fellow of Ashoka. His official presentation took place on June 17, 2016, during a conference organized by the institution in São Paulo.

On January 3, 2022, he assumed the presidency of the Technology and Innovation Commission of the São Paulo section of the Brazilian Bar Association (OAB-SP).

In 2025, he was appointed coordinator of the High-Level Council on Technology, Innovation, and Climate by the United Nations Climate Change Conference (COP30), which proposed the creation of a public digital infrastructure for climate governance.

=== Memberships in Boards ===
In 2006, Lemos joined the board of iCommons, the organization responsible for coordinating the global expansion of the Creative Commons project.

On February 1, 2012, he became a member of the National Council for Combating Piracy and Intellectual Property Crimes, a body coordinated by the Brazilian Ministry of Justice. He served on the council as a representative of the Center for Technology and Society (CTS) at Fundação Getulio Vargas.

In 2013, he became a member of the board of directors of Access Now, an international organization dedicated to defending civil digital rights. He remained in the position until at least the end of 2017.

In May 2014, he was invited by Mitchell Baker, president of the Mozilla Foundation, to join the organization's board, where he served until February 2020. Since 2005, he had already been collaborating with the expansion of Mozilla's projects in Brazil.

Between 2016 and 2018, he was a member of the Deliberative Council of Alemão Oswaldo Cruz Hospital.

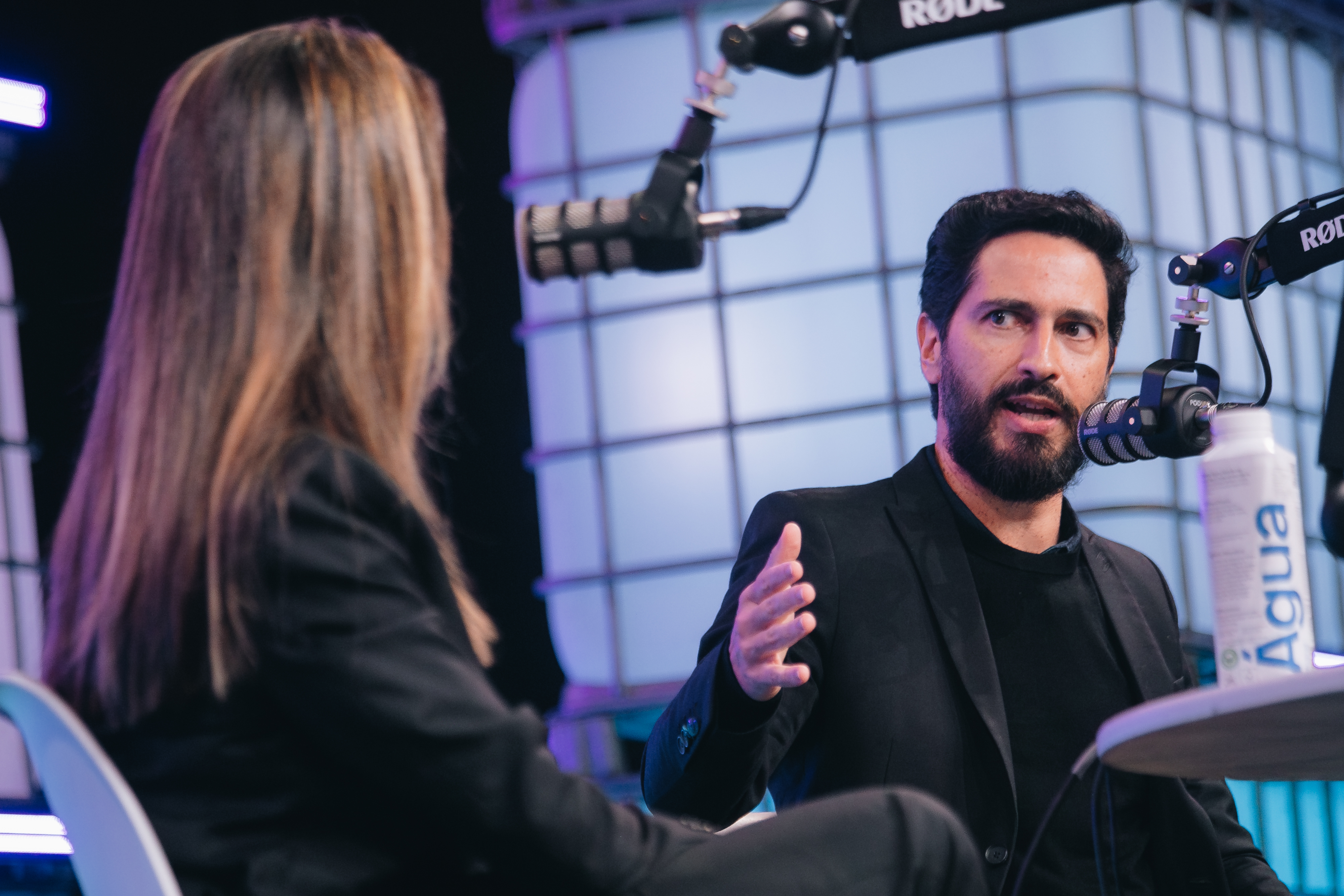
Ronaldo Lemos at the Web Summit Rio 2025

Since at least 2018, he has been a member of the board of the Museum of Tomorrow. He began on the Scientific Council and later joined the Board.

In April 2020, he became a member of the board of directors of the Stellar Development Foundation, an organization aimed at optimizing financial services through blockchain technology. He had been an advisor to the foundation since its creation in 2014.

In May 2020, he joined the Oversight Board, Meta's independent body responsible for reviewing decisions on content moderation on Facebook and Instagram.

In September 2021, he became a member of the 34th Editorial Board of Folha de S.Paulo.

In June 2022, he was announced as an inaugural member of the Spotify Safety Advisory Council, responsible for analyzing and reporting on controversial content related to hate speech, disinformation, extremism, and online abuse.

In 2024, he founded the Council on Artificial Intelligence and Society (CIAS), an entity composed of leaders from various sectors and responsible for conducting a public consultation to guide the future of artificial intelligence regulation in Brazil.

== Career Branches ==
=== Work in Law Firms ===
Ronaldo Lemos's first experience in law firms took place in 1996, when he began an internship in the telecommunications sector of Suchodolski Advogados Associados in São Paulo. The collaboration continued until his departure for the United States in 2001, when he was admitted to the master's program at Harvard University. During this period, Lemos eventually became a partner at the firm.

After more than a decade, he returned to legal practice in 2013, when he joined the law firm Pereira Neto | Macedo Advogados. There, he went on to lead the media and intellectual property practice areas. In 2020, Lemos and his team moved to the firm Rennó Penteado Sampaio Advogados in Rio de Janeiro, where he became the partner responsible for the technology practice.

=== Work as Professor and Researcher in Higher Education Institutions ===
Lemos began his professional career in academia at the University of São Paulo, where he worked as a teaching assistant in the discipline of Legal Sociology between 1999 and 2000. He then became one of the founders of the Rio de Janeiro Law School of Fundação Getulio Vargas in 2002. Initially, he served as coordinator of the Law and Technology program and, after completing his doctorate, became full professor in the field of intellectual property, teaching both undergraduate and graduate courses until 2013.

Also in 2013, he became Professor of Computer Law at the Rio de Janeiro State University, where he remained until 2024.

In 2017, he was a visiting professor at the School of International and Public Affairs (SIPA) at Columbia University in New York, holding the Edward Larocque Tinker Chair. There, he taught the course Tech Policy and Culture in the Developing World: Living on the Edge until 2020. Between 2020 and 2022, he served as a senior adjunct researcher at the institution.

In 2020, Lemos joined the faculty of Schwarzman College at Tsinghua University in Beijing as full professor of technology, where he taught the graduate-level course Technology Policy in the Developing World.

As a visiting researcher, he was at the University of Oxford in 2015, where he developed work related to intellectual property, law, and technology. Between 2011 and 2012, he was a visiting researcher at the Center for Information Technology Policy at Princeton University, New Jersey, where he lectured on technology and innovation.

=== Curation and Organization of Technology Events ===
In March 2003, Lemos organized the Brazilian edition of the I-Law seminar ("Internet Law"), focused on internet legislation. The project was made possible through a partnership between Direito Rio and the Berkman Klein Center for Internet & Society at Harvard University. The goal was to provide internet sector representatives and legal professionals with a deeper understanding of the legal environment related to the web. The seminar was held at the Meridien Hotel in Copacabana and, over five days, brought together international experts such as Lawrence Lessig, Charles Nesson, John Perry Barlow, as well as Harvard Law School professors Yochai Benkler, Jonathan Zittrain and William Fisher III. Lemos led the panel “Current Controversies in Brazil" and served as interlocutor in the panel "Speech on the Internet", organized by the founder of Creative Commons. Among the participants were Gilberto Gil, then Brazil's Minister of Culture; Luiz Guilherme Schymura; Microsoft executive Jason Matusow; among others.

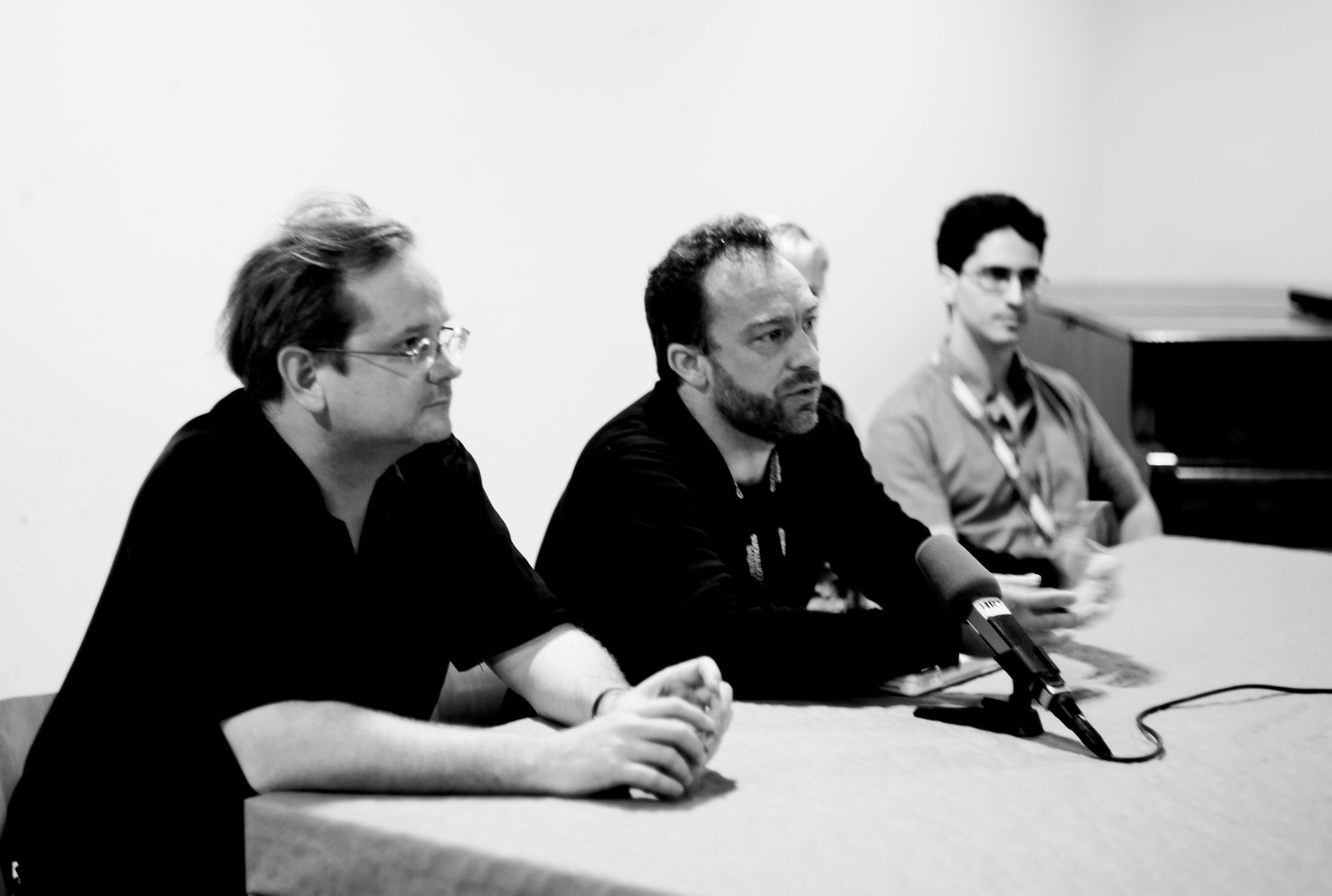
Lawrence Lessig, Jimmy Wales, and Ronaldo Lemos were present at the iSummit, held in Dubrovnik in 2007

In June 2006, Lemos organized the Brazilian edition of the iSummit, the world's largest free culture gathering, promoted by iCommons. The event took place at the Marriott Hotel in Copacabana and brought together representatives from 49 countries to debate knowledge sharing and new ways of producing and distributing creative and informational works over three days. Practical applications of Creative Commons licensing in different sectors were also presented. Among the speakers were Jimmy Wales, founder of Wikipedia; James Boyle, founder of the Center for the Study of the Public Domain at Duke University; Cory Doctorow, writer and editor of the blog Boing Boing; James Love, director of Knowledge Ecology International; John Wilbanks, director at Biogen; Gilberto Gil, then Brazil's Minister of Culture; and Lawrence Lessig, founder of Creative Commons.

During the Brazilian edition of the Spanish festival Sónar, in 2015, he assumed the curatorship of the Sónar+D program, an international conference focused on the technology, creative, and artistic industries.

In 2018, Lemos organized and curated "GovTech Brasil", an event that brought together international speakers and national leaders to discuss methods for incorporating technology into public administration. Among the participants were Toomas Hendrik Ilves, former president of Estonia (one of the most digital countries in the world); Marina Silva, former senator and founder of Sustainability Network; Arminio Fraga, former president of the Central Bank of Brazil; Raul Jungmann, then Brazil's Minister of Public Security; Ilona Szabó, executive director of Instituto Igarapé; Patrícia Ellen, CEO of Optum; Marcos Lisboa, president of Insper; and Ricardo Paes de Barros, coordinator of the Instituto Ayrton Senna.

=== Curatorship and Organization of Cultural Events ===
In 2004, Lemos co-organized a concert in New York in partnership with Wired magazine to raise funds for Creative Commons. The event featured performances by Gilberto Gil and David Byrne, a member of the band Talking Heads.

The following year, in 2005, he took on the role of curator of the Tim Festival. From then on, he worked annually on selecting bands and modernizing the festival, remaining until its last edition in 2008. Through his contribution, bands such as The Strokes, Arctic Monkeys, Arcade Fire, and Kings of Leon performed in Brazil for the first time.

Beginning in 2007, he joined the team of guest curators of FILE Hipersônica, a segment of the International Festival of Electronic Language (FILE) dedicated to musical, sound, visual, and performative manifestations of electronic art.

He also served as curator in both editions of the cultural award festival Movimento HotSpot, held in 2012 and 2013.

In 2023, he became one of the curators of the C6 Fest, a festival created as the successor to the former Free Jazz Festival, which had been held between 1985 and 2001. He continues in this role to the present day.

=== Curation of Informational Content ===
Lemos served as curator of the Itaú Cultural Encyclopedia of Art and Technology between 2010 and 2012. He also organized one of the editions of the magazine Observatório Itaú Cultural.

=== Participation in Examination Boards ===
In 2006 and 2007, he served on the jury of Memefest, the International Festival of Radical Communication held in Slovenia.

In Brazil, he was a jury member for the 8th Sérgio Motta Award for Art and Technology in 2009. In 2015, he served on the jury of the Abril Journalism Award. In 2022, he was part of the jury for the 18th Prêmio Empreendedor Social, promoted by Folha de S.Paulo.

=== Institutional Creations and Enterprises ===
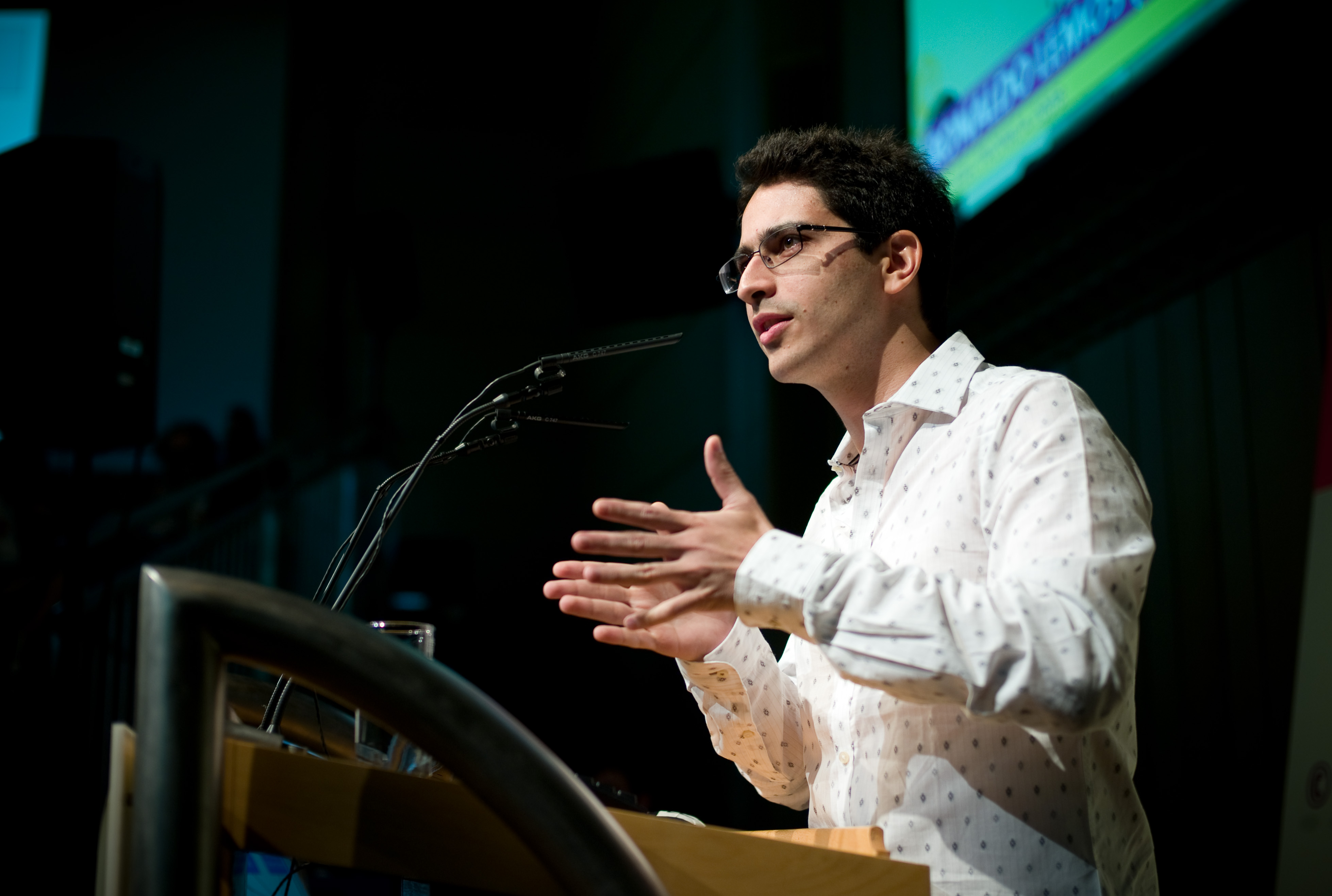
Ronaldo Lemos speaking at the Prix Ars Electronica, when the website Overmundo received the Golden Nica in 2007

Lemos was one of the founders of the Law School of Fundação Getulio Vargas in Rio de Janeiro, known as Direito Rio, inaugurated in 2002.

In 2003, he created the Center for Technology and Society (CTS) at Fundação Getulio Vargas. The official launch of the CTS took place on April 28, 2004, during the Free Software Training and Development Week held in Brasília. Lemos directed the center from its foundation until 2013.

On March 6, 2006, he launched the multicultural collaborative website Overmundo, in partnership with Hermano Vianna, Alê Youssef, and José Marcelo Zacchi, a project for which he received the Prix Ars Electronica in 2007.

In 2013, he founded the Institute for Technology and Society of Rio (ITS Rio), dedicated to studying the impact and future of technology in Brazil and worldwide. The institution collaborates with several global organizations in the development of technological tools and in the organization of scientific events on law, technology and innovation.

=== Career as a Writer ===
Throughout his career, Lemos has published several works covering a wide range of topics related to law, technology, and culture. His first two publications were released during his master's and doctoral studies, in collaboration with Ivo Waisberg. Guided by the legal regulation applied to technology, he organized global studies on the evolution of electronic commerce, which resulted in the book Comércio Eletrônico, published in 2001, and on the legal framework of disputes over virtual domains, which originated the book Conflitos Sobre Nomes de Domínio e Outras Questões Jurídicas da Internet, published in 2002.

In 2005, he released his first solo work, Direito, Tecnologia e Cultura, in which he expanded on proposals for intellectual property reform, addressing legal problems arising from the mismatch between technological advances and copyright law institutions.

In the following years, his publications derived from projects developed at the Center for Technology and Society of Fundação Getulio Vargas. Among them is Direito do Software Livre e a Administração Pública, published in 2007, the result of a study commissioned by the Brazilian National Institute of Information Technology (ITI) on the origins, concepts, and use of free software.

In 2008, in partnership with journalist Oona Castro, he released Tecnobrega: o Pará Reinventando o Negócio da Música, bringing together part of the studies from the Open Business project on alternative forms of music distribution that popularized tecnobrega in Brazil without the intervention of major record labels.

He also organized research related to the Cultura Livre project that explored the impact of technological evolution on the film industry, resulting in the book Três Dimensões do Cinema, published in 2010.

Still within the scope of the Center for Technology and Society, he coordinated the book Pontos de Cultura e Lan-Houses (2011), based on research about the expansion of access to digital culture through internet cafés, carried out within the project Technology, Democracy and Social Inequality: Best Practices and Public Policies, funded by the Brazilian Funding Authority for Studies and Projects (FINEP).

In 2012, he launched Futuros Possíveis, a collection of more than 300 articles published over the years in Folha de S.Paulo, Trip Magazine, and the website Overmundo, including unpublished texts.

In 2014, in collaboration with sociologist Massimo di Felice, he published A Vida em Rede, which explores social changes in the face of technological advances.

Subsequently, he took part in the drafting of a series of books related to the Marco Civil da Internet, beginning with Marco Civil da Internet, co-edited with George Salomão Leite and published in 2014.

In 2015, together with researchers from ITS Rio, he released Understanding Brazil's Internet Bill of Rights, a book in English presenting Brazilian legislation to an international audience. In 2017, this work was revised and expanded, published as Brazil's Internet Bill of Rights: A Closer Look.

In 2016, in co-authorship with Carlos Affonso Souza, he published Marco Civil da Internet: Construção e Aplicação, detailing the methodologies used in the development of the Marco Civil da Internet, from its conception to the final regulation. On the same subject, he also coordinated Marco Civil da Internet: Jurisprudência Comentada, published in 2017.

In partnership with Daniel Marques, he coordinated Open Justice na Era da Hiperconectividade, released in 2023. The book addresses opportunities and technical, legal, and regulatory challenges related to building a data culture, highlighting its potential to promote legal certainty, innovation in law, and improved access to the courts. The preface was written by Justice Luiz Fux of the Brazilian Supreme Federal Court (STF).

In addition, Lemos has contributed to several other works, including Arte Censura Liberdade: Reflexões à Luz do Presente (2018), Dicionário da República (2019), organized by Heloisa Starling and Lili Schwarz, Democracia em Risco? (2019), also organized by Heloisa Starling and Lili Schwarz, Compliance e Políticas de Proteção de Dados (2021), and Supremo 4.0 (2022).

== Awards and Recognitions ==
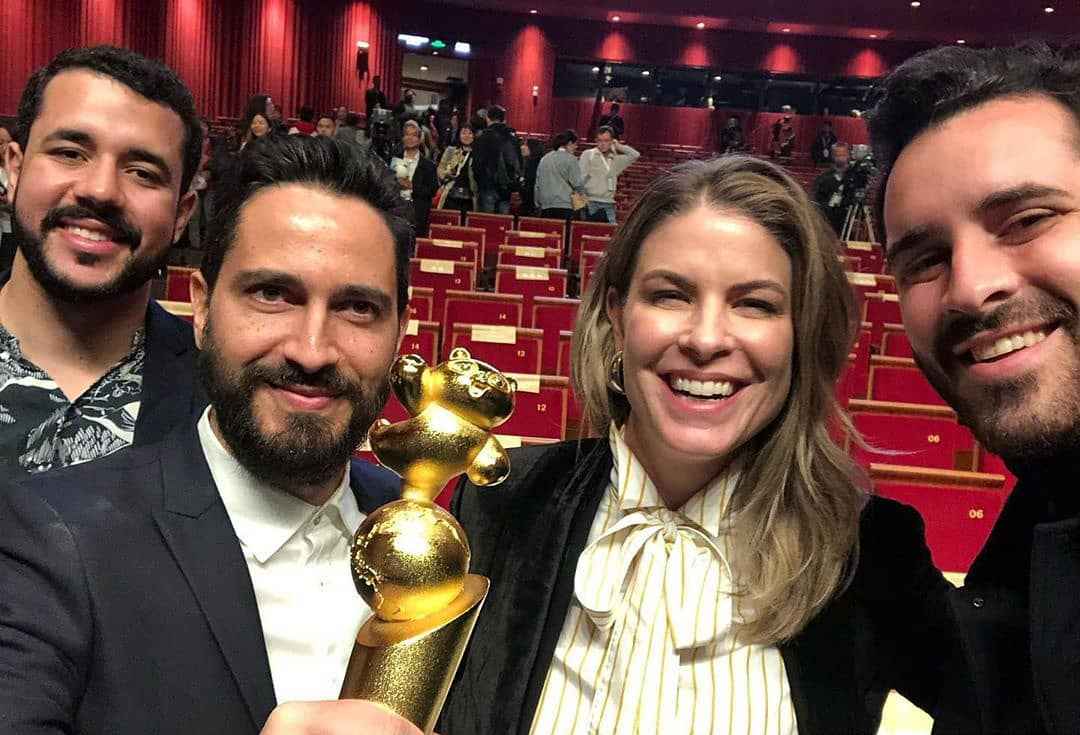
Ronaldo Lemos and the Expresso Futuro team at the award ceremony of the Sichuan TV Festival in 2019

For the creation of the website Overmundo, Lemos received, in 2007, the international Golden Nica award, granted by Prix Ars Electronica in a ceremony held in Austria.

In 2016, he was awarded the Google Social Impact Challenge Prize for the platform Mudamos. With this initiative, he also won the Gol Novos Tempos Prize and was a finalist for the Google Social Entrepreneur Award in 2017.

In 2019, the program Expresso Futuro earned him the Gold Panda, the top prize at the Sichuan Television Festival the largest in Asia. In the same year, he also received the TAL Award, granted by Televisión América Latina.

On July 29, 2025, he was awarded the Grand Order of Merit Anhanguera, the highest honor granted by the government of the State of Goiás. The recognition was due to his contribution to the drafting of the Artificial Intelligence Law of the State of Goiás (Complementary Law No. 205/2025), the first broad legal framework in Brazil dedicated to artificial intelligence. The same decoration had previously been awarded to the writer Cora Coralina in 1978.

Lemos has consistently been listed among the most admired lawyers in Brazil, according to surveys by Análise Advocacia. He is also recognized in the Brazilian and Latin American rankings of Chambers and Partners, a British company specializing in researching and ranking lawyers and law firms worldwide.

== Published books ==
2001	Comércio Eletrônico Revista dos Tribunais e Instituto dos Advogados de São Paulo ISBN: 852032066X
2002	Conflitos Sobre Nomes de Domínio: e Outras Questões Jurídicas da Internet Revista dos Tribunais e FGV Editora ISBN: 8520323251
2005	Direito, Tecnologia e Cultura FGV Editora ISBN: 8522505160
2007	Direito do Software Livre e a Administração Pública Lumen Juris ISBN: 9788537500491
2008	Tecnobrega: O Para Reinventando o Negócio da Música Aeroplano Editora e Consultoria ISBN: 9788578200077
2010	Três Dimensões do Cinema: Economia, Direitos Autorais e Tecnologia FGV Editora ISBN: 9788522508082
2011	Pontos de Cultura e Lan-houses: Estruturas para inovação na Base da Pirâmide Social FGV Editora ISBN: 9780984904402
2012	Futuros Possíveis – Mídia, Cultura, Sociedade, Direitos Editora Sulina ISBN: 9788520506592
2014	A Vida em Rede Editora Papirus 7 Mares ISBN: 9788561773618
2014	Marco Civil da Internet Editora Atlas ISBN: 9788522493395
2015	Understanding Brazil's Internet Bill of Rights ITS Rio ISBN: 9788555960000
2016	Marco Civil da Internet: Construção e Aplicação Editar Editora Associada ISBN: 9788578511562
2017	Brazil's Internet Bill of Rights: A Closer Look ITS Rio ISBN: 9788578511722
2017	Marco Civil da Internet: Jurisprudência Comentada Revista dos Tribunais ISBN: 9788520372012
2023	Open Justice na Era da Hiperconectividade Revista dos Tribunais ISBN: 9786526000106

== Personal life ==
Since his youth, he has practiced fencing. During his time at Harvard, he led an initiative to teach the sport to students at the institution. Ronaldo is a competitor in the épée and sabre categories, having won medals on multiple occasions in competitions.
