= P'ra Você Gostar de Mim =

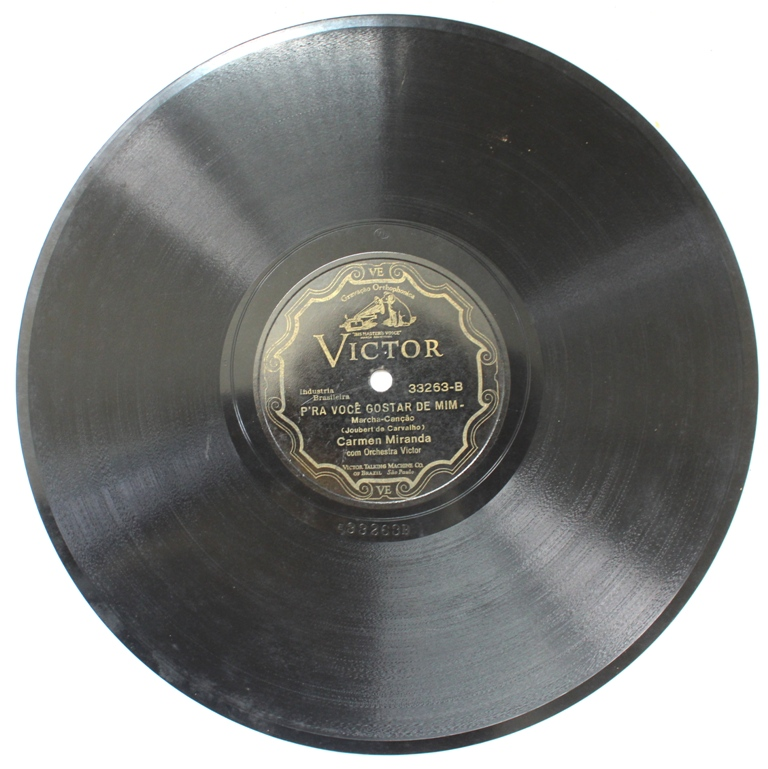

Song by Carmen Miranda
- Released: 1930
- Genre: Carnival March
- Label: RCA Victor
- Composer(s): Joubert de Carvalho

P'ra Você Gostar de Mim, popularly known as Taí, is a song composed by Joubert de Carvalho and recorded by Carmen Miranda on January 27, 1930. It was Carmen Miranda's first major hit, remaining well known to this day, and sold around 35,000 copies, a record for that time.

In 2016, the song ranked third on the list of "100 Best Songs in the History of Samba" by Veja magazine. According to ECAD, it was Carmen Miranda's most played recording in Brazil between July 2010 and March 2015.

== Background ==
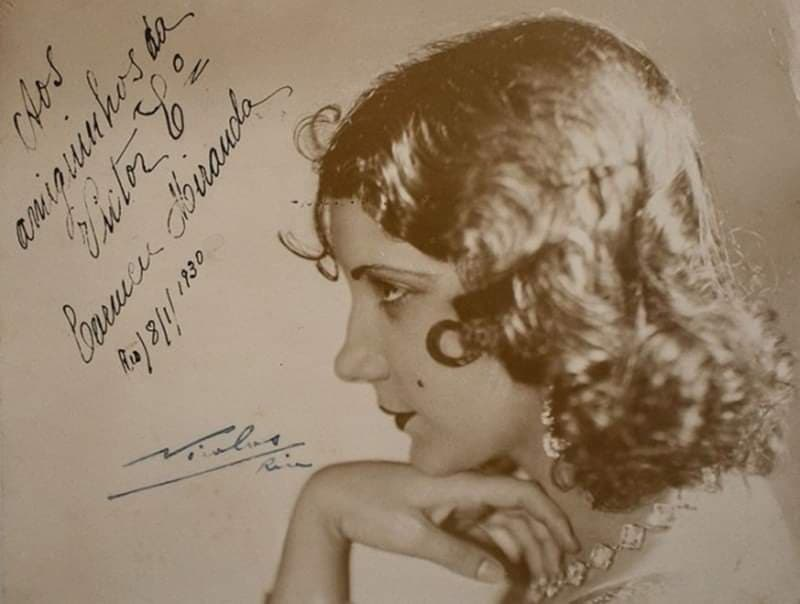
Carmen Miranda in 1930.

In early 1929, Carmen Miranda made her debut on stage at the National Institute of Music during a charity event at Passeio Público. That same year, Josué de Barros took his pupil to sing on the Educadora and Sociedade radio stations. He also provided Carmen with several public performances and the opportunity to record discs, starting with Brunswick and later with RCA Victor.

The following year, she recorded "Taí," by Joubert de Carvalho, which established her as the most popular voice on the radio during Carnival that year. With this success, Carmen Miranda became the most famous singer in Brazil. The magazine Phono-Arte, on February 28, 1931, declared: "Carmen Miranda is the female equivalent of Francisco Alves, meaning the most valued in the phonographic industry."

In November 1930, Carmen signed a recording contract with RCA Victor, the Brazilian subsidiary of the American music conglomerate. As she was still under 21, she needed her father's approval and signature to formalize the agreement. During the 1930s, she recorded nearly 300 songs, many of them composed specifically for her by renowned Brazilian authors such as Ary Barroso, Synval Silva, Dorival Caymmi, and Assis Valente.

== Cover version ==
Artists such as Roberta Miranda, Eduardo Dussek, Roberta Sá, Tom Zé, and Nara Leão have covered this song.
