= Schwarzman Scholars =

Postgraduate award program for students to study at Tsinghua University in China

- 苏世民学者
- Type: Private
- Established: 2016; 10 years ago
- Affiliations: Tsinghua University
- Endowment: $575 million
- Chairman: Stephen A. Schwarzman
- Dean: Xue Lan
- Director: Amy Stursberg
- Students: 100–200
- Location: Beijing, China
- Campus: Urban
- Language: English
- Colors: Blue, Purple, Gold, and White
- Website: www.schwarzmanscholars.org

Chinese name
- Simplified Chinese: 苏世民学者
- Traditional Chinese: 蘇世民學者
Transcriptions
Standard Mandarin
- Hanyu Pinyin: Sūshìmín Xuézhě

Schwarzman Scholars (Chinese: 苏世民学者; pinyin: Sūshìmín Xuézhě), founded by American financier and philanthropist Stephen A. Schwarzman, is a one-year fully-funded master's degree leadership program at Tsinghua University in Beijing, China. The program selects 100–200 scholars per year based on their leadership ability, academic achievement, and commitment to advancing mutual cultural understanding and global progress. Selected scholars pursue a one-year master's degree in global affairs at Tsinghua University, residing at Schwarzman College.

The program launched in June 2016, upon the completion of Schwarzman College at Tsinghua University, located in Beijing, China and is housed in a college designed by Robert A.M. Stern, Dean of the Yale School of Architecture. It hosts up to 200 scholars annually from the United States, China, and other countries around the world. Schwarzman Scholars has an acceptance rate comparable to the Rhodes and Marshall scholarships, making it one of the most competitive scholarships in the world.

Modeled on the Rhodes Scholarship at Oxford University and the classical Chinese academies known as Shūyuàn (Schwarzman College is called Sūshìmín Shūyuàn in Chinese, translated directly as Schwarzman Academy), Schwarzman Scholars at Tsinghua University is a competitor in funding to similar international scholarship programs like the Yenching Scholarship at Peking University. Since its founding, the program has maintained ties to the United Front Work Department as well as other organizations and personnel affiliated with the Chinese Communist Party.

== History and motivation ==
Schwarzman Scholars was conceptualized by its founder, Stephen A. Schwarzman, in response to what he saw as growing tensions between the United States and China, largely due to China's economic growth. According to Schwarzman, in the fall of 2010, then-university president Gu Binglin asked if Schwarzman would want to help Tsinghua with a concept for a "Global Scholars" program. At the time, Schwarzman was on the advisory board of Tsinghua University's School of Economics and Management. A year later in 2011, a delegation from Tsinghua visited Schwarzman in New York where the concept was put on hold until the leadership at Tsinghua had changed (the term of the then-executive administration was ending) and the 2008 financial crisis had receded.

In 2012, the newly appointed Tsinghua president Chen Jining met with Schwarzman in Paris. Schwarzman, who was interested in moving forward with the concept, put forth six ideas that would "reduce friction" for the new program. First, the college would need its own physical facility. Second, the program would need to be immersive, including travel and field work across the country with professors. Third, the program would assign mentors to each of the scholars in their area of interest. Fourth, there had to be no cost to the scholars. Fifth, the program would only be one year instead of two or three years long. Sixth and last, the program would be taught in English. Schwarzman told Chen:

If we do this, what I really want to do is construct a program that has the same prestige as the Rhodes, because those are the students that I’m aiming for.

With 200 scholars per year, he envisioned an alumni network of 10,000 scholars within a half century to include future heads of state and government. In spring of 2013, the program was announced at the Great Hall of the People, the seat of the National People's Congress in Beijing, China, and began its fundraising campaign.

== Fundraising ==
In 2013, Stephen A. Schwarzman announced a $100 million personal gift and $200 million fundraising campaign to build and endow Schwarzman Scholars, an elite international scholarship program at Tsinghua University in Beijing. Over $575 million has been raised to date, from a coterie of global donors.

In spring 2014, Peking University, Tsinghua's chief rival, announced its own global scholarship program, the Yenching Scholars at Yenching Academy, further increasing competition for funding. In summer 2014, Tsinghua University announced it had reached its original fundraising goal and that it would increase it to US$350 million. In 2014, when the program first launched its admissions process, Tsinghua's Schwarzman had already raised US$333 million for its endowment fund. Shortly after a third target of US$400 million, to be reached by the following year, was announced. Commenting on the fundraising competition, Charles Conn, former warden of Rhodes House at Oxford University remarked:

The Rhodes scholarships and Schwarzman Scholars programs have similar endowments and fund-raising goals. Which one is ahead in any given week depends mainly on the exchange rate of the pound, which has weakened lately against the dollar.

Meanwhile, it became clear that the Yenching Academy at Peking University would be funded through Chinese private donations and government grants, which set off competition to further grow the two programs' endowments. As a result of the increased competition among full-scholarship leadership programs, there was a marked growth in fundraising, with the endowments moving towards a half billion USD each.

== Program design and allocation ==
Schwarzman Scholars study for a one-year master's degree (Master of Management Science; Chinese: 管理科学硕士) in Global Affairs (Chinese: 全球领导力) at Tsinghua University. The required core curriculum centers on three pillars: Leadership, Global Affairs, and China. The scholars live and study at the Schwarzman College, a purpose-built residential college inside Tsinghua University designed by Robert A.M. Stern, former Dean of the Yale School of Architecture. Scholars live in Beijing for a year of study.

Approximately 40% of the participants come from the U.S., 20% from China and 40% from the rest of the world. Students apply directly to the program and are not required to obtain a nomination from their university. The Institute of International Education in the U.S., which administers the Fulbright Scholarships, was initially responsible for the international and American selection processes. This process is now managed by the program's Admissions team.

Prospective applicants with passports and permanent resident cards from Mainland China, Hong Kong, Macau, and Taiwan, are required to apply earlier than applicants from other countries using a different online application portal, regardless of where they may have attended university or reside.

== Cohorts ==
The program is based on a cohort system, where admitted students live, dine and study together in a close environment, similar to the collegiate system in some British Universities. In 2014, Schwarzman Scholars held four recruitment launch events in New York City (at the Morgan Library & Museum), Singapore (introduced by National University of Singapore President Tan Chor Chuan), London (at the Tower Bridge, introduced by Oxford University Vice-Chancellor Andrew D. Hamilton), and Palo Alto in the San Francisco Bay Area (at Stanford University).

The inaugural cohort of 111 scholars was announced on January 10, 2016, and selected from a group of roughly 3,050 applicants. With an acceptance rate comparable to the Rhodes and Marshall scholarships, the founding class included five graduates of Princeton, five students from Yale, and six alumni of Harvard.

== Leadership and governance ==
=== International advisory board ===
- The Right Honorable Tony Blair, former prime minister of the United Kingdom (honorary)
- The Right Honorable Brian Mulroney, former prime minister of Canada (honorary)
- The Honorable Kevin Rudd, former prime minister of Australia (honorary)
- Henry "Hank" Paulson, 74th United States Secretary of the Treasury (honorary)
- John L. Thornton, chairman of the Brookings Institution, professor and director of Global Leadership at Tsinghua University (honorary)
- Condoleezza Rice, 66th United States Secretary of State (honorary)
- Richard Haass, president, Council on Foreign Relations (honorary)
- Yo-Yo Ma, American cellist (honorary)
- Graham Allison, Douglas Dillon Professor of Government, Harvard Kennedy School
- Norman Chan, former chief executive, Hong Kong Monetary Authority
- Chen Ning Yang, Albert Einstein Professor Emeritus at SUNY Stony Brook; Nobel Laureate in Physics, honorary director Institute of Advanced Study, Tsinghua University
- Tung Chee Hwa ("CH Tung"), former chief executive and president of the executive council of Hong Kong and current vice chairman of the National Committee of the Chinese People's Political Consultative Conference

In Emeritus:

- Nicolas Sarkozy, former president of the French Republic (honorary)
- Robert "Bob" Rubin, seventieth United States secretary of the treasury, co-chairman of the Council on Foreign Relations (honorary)
- Richard "Rick" Levin, former president of Yale University (honorary)
- Sir Colin Lucas, former vice-chancellor, University of Oxford, former warden Rhodes Trust
- Richard H. Brodhead, president emeritus, Duke University (honorary)
- Robert Dudley, group chief executive, BP

In Memoriam:

- Henry Kissinger, 56th United States Secretary of State (honorary)
- Colin Powell – in memoriam, sixty-fifth United States Secretary of State (honorary)
- Sir James "Jim" Wolfensohn – in memoriam, ninth president of the World Bank Group (honorary)

=== Academic advisory council ===
Schwarzman Scholars has an advisory board whose members include former leaders in government and affiliates of institutions such as Harvard, Yale, Stanford, Duke and Oxford.

- Michael Cappello, Professor of Pediatrics, Epidemiology, and Microbial Pathogenesis; Yale Program in International Child Health; Director, Yale World Fellows Program, Yale University
- Jane Edwards, Associate Dean of Yale College, Dean of International and Professional Experience, Yale University
- William C. Kirby, Spangler Family Professor of Business Administration; T.M. Chang Professor of China Studies, Harvard
- Qian Yingyi, Distinguished Professor of Arts, Humanities and Social Sciences, Tsinghua University; Former Dean, School of Economics and Management, Tsinghua University
- Yinuo Li, Senior Advisor, Bill & Melinda Gates Foundation China Program

== See also ==
- Knight-Hennessy Scholars at Stanford University
- Harry S. Truman Scholarship
