= Jiang Xiaojuan =

Chinese economist and politician

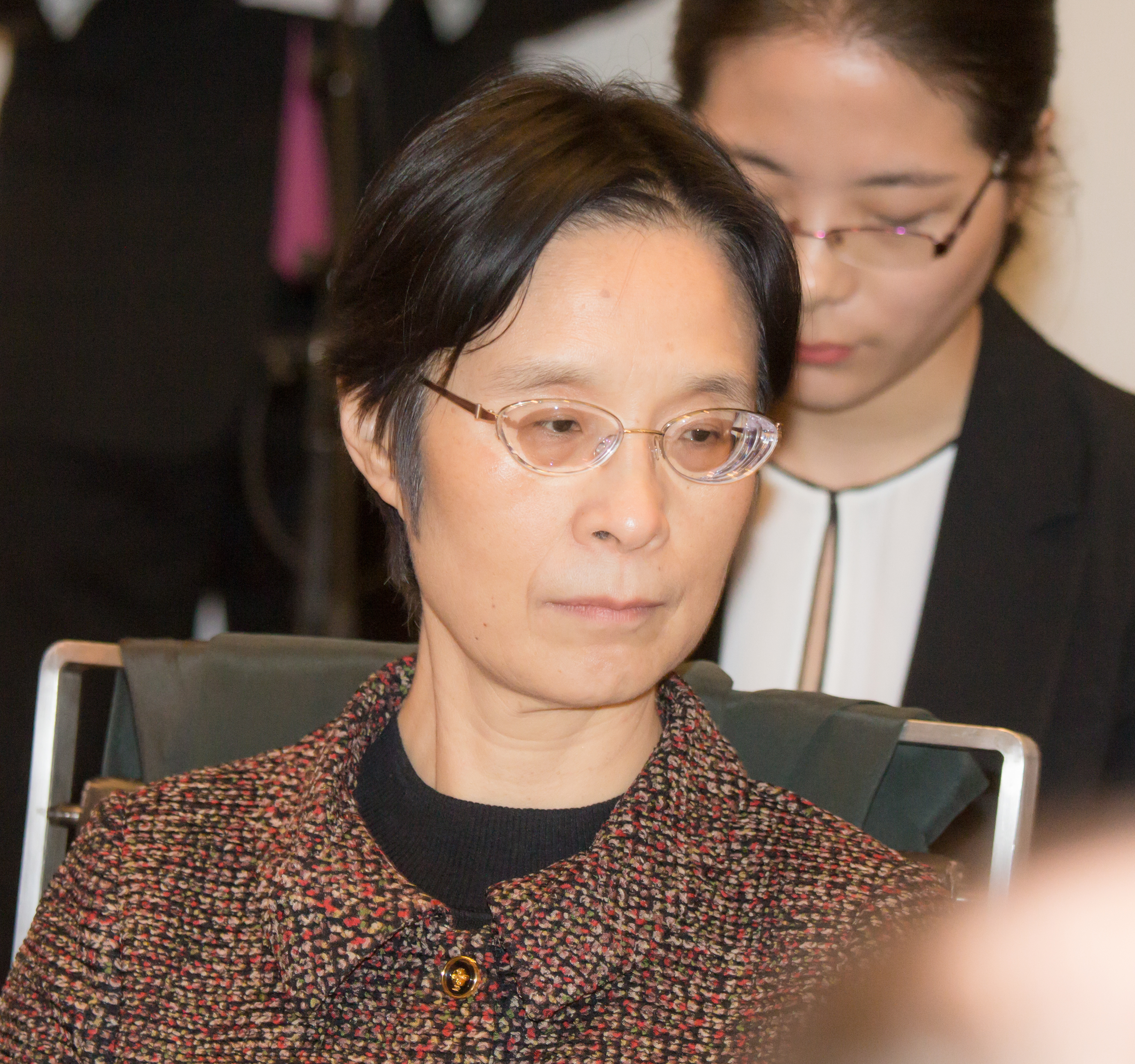
- Jiang Xiaojuan in 2016
- Born: June 1957 (age 69); Xi'an, Shaanxi, China
- Education: Xi'an Jiaotong University (BA) Chinese Academy of Social Sciences (PhD)
- Occupations: Economist, Politician
- Employer: Tsinghua University
- Political party: Chinese Communist Party
- Awards: "Woman Pacesetter" (1995) "Outstanding Youth" in CASS (1996) 8th "Sun Yefang Economic Science Award" (1998) 5th "China Economic Theory Innovation Award" (2012)

Jiang Xiaojuan (Chinese: 江小涓; born June 1956 in Xi'an) is a Chinese economist and politician. She is a Professor and Dean of the School of Public Policy and Management of Tsinghua University, and a research professor at the Chinese Academy of Social Sciences (CASS). She is a Standing Committee Member of the National People's Congress (NPC) and Vice Chairperson of the NPC Social Construction Committee, taking charge of lawmaking, revision, enforcement, and supervision of social insurance, sports, protection of women's and children's rights and others. She was elected President of the Chinese Public Administration Society in 2019.

== Academic research ==
Jiang is an expert on transnational investment, industrial economy and economic development in China. She has written extensively on the industrial upgrading in China's system transition, foreign mergers and acquisitions in China and China's foreign trade theories. In 1998, she won the 8th "Sun Yefang Economic Science Award" (The Sun Yefang Prize for Economic Science is the highest award in China's economic field and is known as the "China's Nobel Prize for Economics".) as a member of the research group of "Research on Severely Loss-making State-owned Enterprises" of the Chinese Academy of Social Sciences. In 2012, she, Ma Jiantang and Zhou Shulian jointly proposed the China Economic Structure Adjustment Theory and won the fifth China economic theory innovation award.

=== Research on Severely Loss-making State-owned Enterprises (1998) ===
Jiang was one of the leaders of this project team. Their research shows that the reasons for the loss can be divided into institutional reasons and non-institutional reasons. Institutional reasons can be divided into the enterprise's own reasons and enterprise's objective reasons. Enterprise's own reason, namely mechanism malpractice and enterprise management lag; The objective reasons for enterprises mainly include four aspects. Second, the cost of more than ten years of reform is mostly borne by state-owned enterprises; Third, the improper macroeconomic regulation and control, resulting in economic growth ups and downs; Fourth, macro-policy issues, major reform of the fiscal and taxation systems and accounting systems, drastic changes in the exchange rate, and the impact of imported products on the domestic market.

=== China Economic Structure Adjustment Theory (2012) ===
This theory was one of the typical economic innovation theories in the country since the reform and opening up, it is put forward through market means and government administrative means, through the initiative to break system obstacle, eliminate the factor market segmentation, reduce bottleneck department, select leading industry economic structure adjustment measures, such as coordination of various departments of the national economy, all kinds of industries, all kinds of each part of the ownership composition, all kinds of economic organizations, and all aspects of composition and proportion relationship, coordination of resources in the configuration status of the economic structure and development level, eventually form elements in various industries, between regions and departments to optimize configuration.

== Career ==
Here is a record of positions held by Jiang:

2019 -	President of the Chinese Public Administration Society
2018 -	Dean of School of Public Policy and Management, Tsinghua University
2012 - 2017	Alternate, 18th Central Committee of the Chinese Communist Party
2011 -	Deputy Secretary-General, State Council of the People's Republic of China
2009 - 2011	Deputy Secretary, Research Office of the State Council of the People's Republic of China Chinese Communist Party, Leading Party Group
2004 - 2011	Deputy Director, Research Office of the State Council of the People's Republic of China
	Secretary-General, International Investment Research Centre, Chinese Academy of Social Sciences
	Vice-chairman, International Investment Research Centre, Chinese Academy of Social Sciences
1989 - 2004	Director, Research Office of Industrial Economics Research Institute, Chinese Academy of Social Sciences
	Researcher, Chinese Academy of Social Sciences
	Director, Institute of Finance and Trade Economics, Chinese Academy of Social Sciences
1986 - 1989	Student, Graduate School (Doctoral Candidate), Chinese Academy of Social Sciences
1984 - 1986	Instructor, Department of Industrial Economics, Xi'an Jiaotong University, Xi'an City, Shaanxi Province, China
1981 - 1984	Student, Department of Industrial Economics, Xi'an Jiaotong University, Xi'an City, Shaanxi Province, China

== Selected works ==
=== Published papers in Chinese ===
- Jiang, X. (1993). Public Choice in China's Industrial Policy (中国推行产业政策中的公共选择问题). Economic Research Journal., 4–19. doi:CNKI:SUN:JJYJ.0.1993-06-000.
- Jiang, X. (1994). International Comparative Study on the Impact and Countermeasures of "Customs Entry" (“入关”冲击与对策的国际比较研究). Social Sciences in China Press. 31–44. doi:CNKI:SUN:ZSHK.0.1994-05-002.
- Jiang, X. (1998). Inefficient Competition in the Course of Marketization—A Case Study of Cotton Textile Industry (市场化进程中的低效率竞争——以棉纺织行业为例). Economic Research Journal., 42-51+77.doi:CNKI:SUN:JJYJ.0.1998-03-005.
- Jiang, X. (1999). Theory, Practice, Reference and Development of Chinese Economics—A Case Study of Industrial Structure Theory (理论、实践、借鉴与中国经济学的发展——以产业结构理论研究为例). Social Sciences in China Press. 4–18. doi:CNKI:SUN:ZSHK.0.1999-06-000.
- Jiang, X. (2002). Transnational Investment, Market Structure and Competitive Behaviour of Foreign-invested Enterprises (跨国投资、市场结构与外商投资企业的竞争行为). Economic Research Journal.31-38+66+93.doi:CNKI:SUN:JJYJ.0.2002-09-003.

=== Published papers in English ===
- Jiang, X. (2008). The Determinants and Trends of China's Exportable Structure. China Economic Journal,1(2), 191–202. doi:10.1080/17538960802076646.

=== Published books in Chinese ===
- Jiang, X. (1993). A Study of China's Industrial Development and Foreign Economic and Trade Relations (中国工业发展与对外经济贸易关系的研究). China: Economics & Management Publishing House.
- Jiang, X. (1996). Industrial Policy in the Period of Economic Transition: Empirical Analysis and Prospect of China's Experience (经济转轨时期的产业政策:对中国经验的实证分析与前景展望). China: Shanghai People Publishing House.
- Jiang, X. (1996). Upgrading of the Industrial Structure at the Turn of the Century (世纪之交的工业结构升级). China: Shanghai Far East Publishers.
- Jiang, X. (2002). Foreign Investment in China - Contribution to Growth, Structural Upgrading and Competitiveness (中国的外资经济——对增长、结构升级和竞争力的贡献). China Renmin University Press.

=== Published books in English ===
- Jiang, X. (2001). China's Industrial Transition: Organizational Change, Efficiency Gains, and Growth Dynamics. New York: Nova Science Publishers.
- Jiang, X. (2004). FDI in China: Contributions to Growth, Restructuring, and Competitiveness. New York : Nova Science Publishers.
