= Yinuo Li =

Chinese female educator

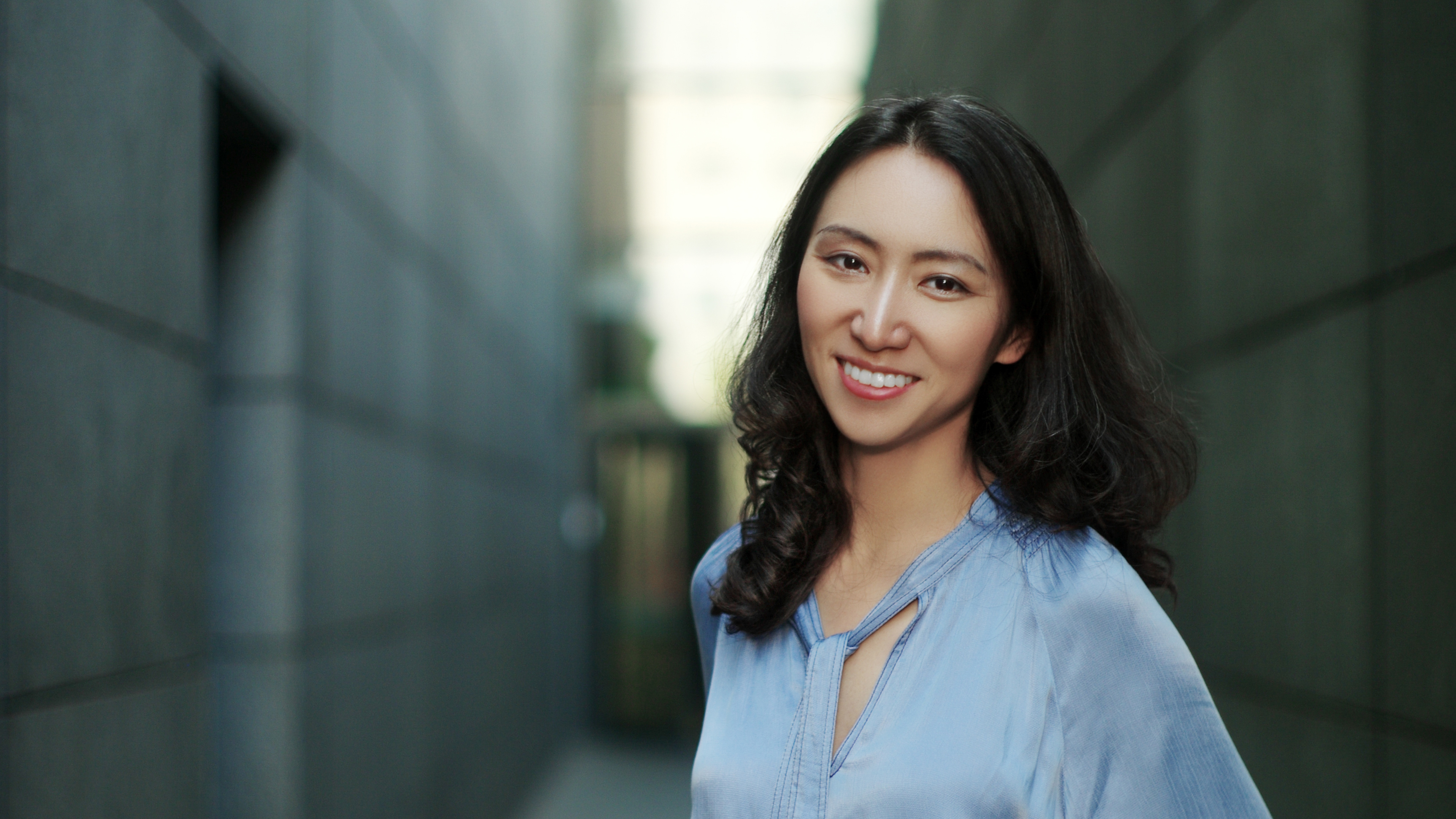
Image of Yinuo Li

Yinuo Li is a Chinese educator. She is the co-founder of ETU school and has been the Director of the China Program at the Bill & Melinda Gates Foundation.

== Early life and education ==
In 1977, Yinuo was born in Jinan, Shandong Province. Her mother was a supervisor at a chemical plant in Jinan. When Yinuo was seven years old, her mother was sent to Germany to pursue further studies. When Yinuo was thirteen years old, her parents divorced. She began to live with her mother. From her mother, Yinuo learned about hard work and taking responsibility. At the age of eighteen, she entered Tsinghua University's biology department.

== Career ==
In 2005, Yinuo started her career as a consultant at Mckinsey. At that time, she was the only Chinese employee at Mckinsey's Los Angeles office. In 2011, she became a global partner at Mckinsey and was one of the only two partners who graduated from a Chinese university. She was also the first Chinese female partner. Her expertise was in the health industry.

In 2014, Yinuo started a WeChat public account, "Nuli Society," with her husband. Within two and a half years, the account had more than 400,000 followers.

From 2015 to 2020, Yinuo was the Director of the China Program at the Bill & Melinda Gates Foundation. She focused on health, development, and policy.

In 2016, while looking for a school for her child, she realized that both international school and public school systems had faults. Subsequently, she co-founded Etu School, comprising three campuses around the world.

Starting in 2022, Li has been focused on teaching career workshops through her personal website, yinuoli.org.

Yinuo serves as a trustee of the 21st Century Education Research Institute and as a board member on the Academic Advisory Board for the Schwarzman Scholarship. She was previously a member of the final selection committee of the Rhodes Scholarship in China.

== Personal life ==
Yinuo and her husband have three children.

== Publications ==
2020 "School Is A Little Bigger Than Home"

2021 "Where Strength Comes From: Facing Every Fear"

== Awards and honors ==
2016: World Economic Forum's Young Global Leaders

2017: ifeng.com's "Top 10 Charity Figures of the Year"

2018: Portrait Magazine's "Women of the Year"

2018: Center for China and Globalization's "40 Influential Returnees in 40 Years of Reform and Opening-up"

2020: Fortunechina.com's "The Most Influential Female Business Leader in China"
