= Yenching Academy =

Postgraduate college of Peking University in Beijing, China

- 燕京学堂 (Chinese)
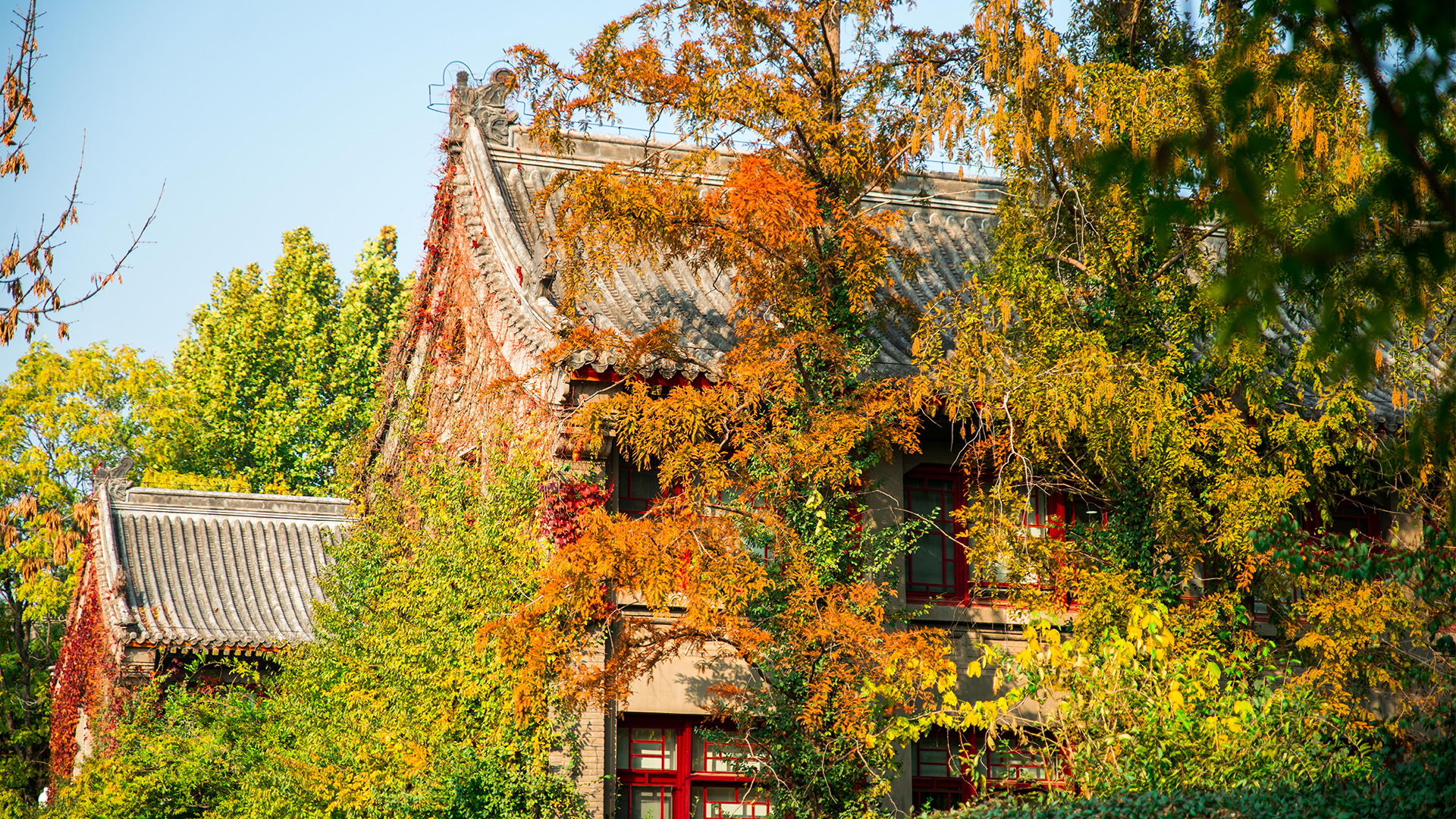
- The main teaching buildings of Peking University's Yenching Academy program in 2019
- Type: Postgraduate Leadership Program
- Established: 2014; 12 years ago
- Parent institution: Peking University
- Dean: Yuan Ming
- Associate Dean: Wang Bo
- Students: 216 (2020)
- Postgraduates: 216 (2020)
- Location: Jingyuan Courtyard 3, Peking University, 5 Yiheyuan Road, Haidian District, Beijing, Municipality of Beijing, 100871, China
- Colors: Red
- Website: yenchingacademy.org

The Yenching Academy (YCA, also Yanjing Academy or Yanjing College; Chinese: 燕京学堂, pinyin: Yānjīng Xuétáng) is a postgraduate college of Peking University, located in Beijing, China. It hosts the Yenching Scholarship, a fully funded prestigious global scholarship program, designed "to cultivate leaders who will advocate for global progress and cultural understanding." The academy offers Yenching Scholars, selected annually from around the world, with full scholarships for one or two years of study leading to a master's degree from Peking University.

Inspired by the classical Chinese academies or shuyuan and the Rhodes Scholarship at Oxford University, Yenching Academy at Peking University will compete with the younger Schwarzman College program at Tsinghua University in China and similar global scholarship programs around the world.

== Yenching Scholarship ==
The Yenching Scholarship program is a two-year fully funded global leadership program designed to provide outstanding young scholars with a broad interdisciplinary postgraduate education that reflects global perspectives. During their studies, Yenching Scholars will live in Yenching Academy, a residential college of Peking University, built specifically for the program and modeled on those at Harvard and MIT in the United States and Oxford and Cambridge in the United Kingdom.

The Yenching Scholarship provides students at Yenching Academy with full funding for their studies including tuition fees, accommodation, transportation, travel, and a living stipend. Annually, around 125 Yenching Scholars are chosen through a highly competitive selection process that seeks future global leaders. The acceptance rate for the most recent cohort is 2.7 per cent. Yenching Scholars are "a diverse group of talented young leaders who demonstrate academic excellence, leadership, innovative thought, and a commitment to the betterment of society." Successful applicants are elite students who have an excellent academic record and demonstrate outstanding leadership potential. Approximately 65% of the 100 inaugural scholars are international students while the remaining 35% are from mainland China. The academy's first cohort of Yenching Scholars were from a number of prestigious universities, with the most numerous coming from Oxford, Harvard, Princeton, Cambridge, Chicago, Stanford, and Yale. Scholars represented 36 countries and regions, from Armenia and Australia to Vietnam and Zimbabwe.

With the arrival of its newest 6th cohort, the program has now hosted students of well over 60 different nationalities. The cohorts consisted of an almost equal distribution of Asian, European, North American, and Southern Hemisphere students. Among the students of the 6th cohort, 40 are from Asia, 4 from Africa, 22 from North America, 20 from Europe, 4 from South America, 1 from Oceania, 1 from the Middle East. The current president of the General Student Union (GSU), Yenching Academy's democratically elected student representatives, is Zecha Mpemba from Kenya.

== Yenching Program ==
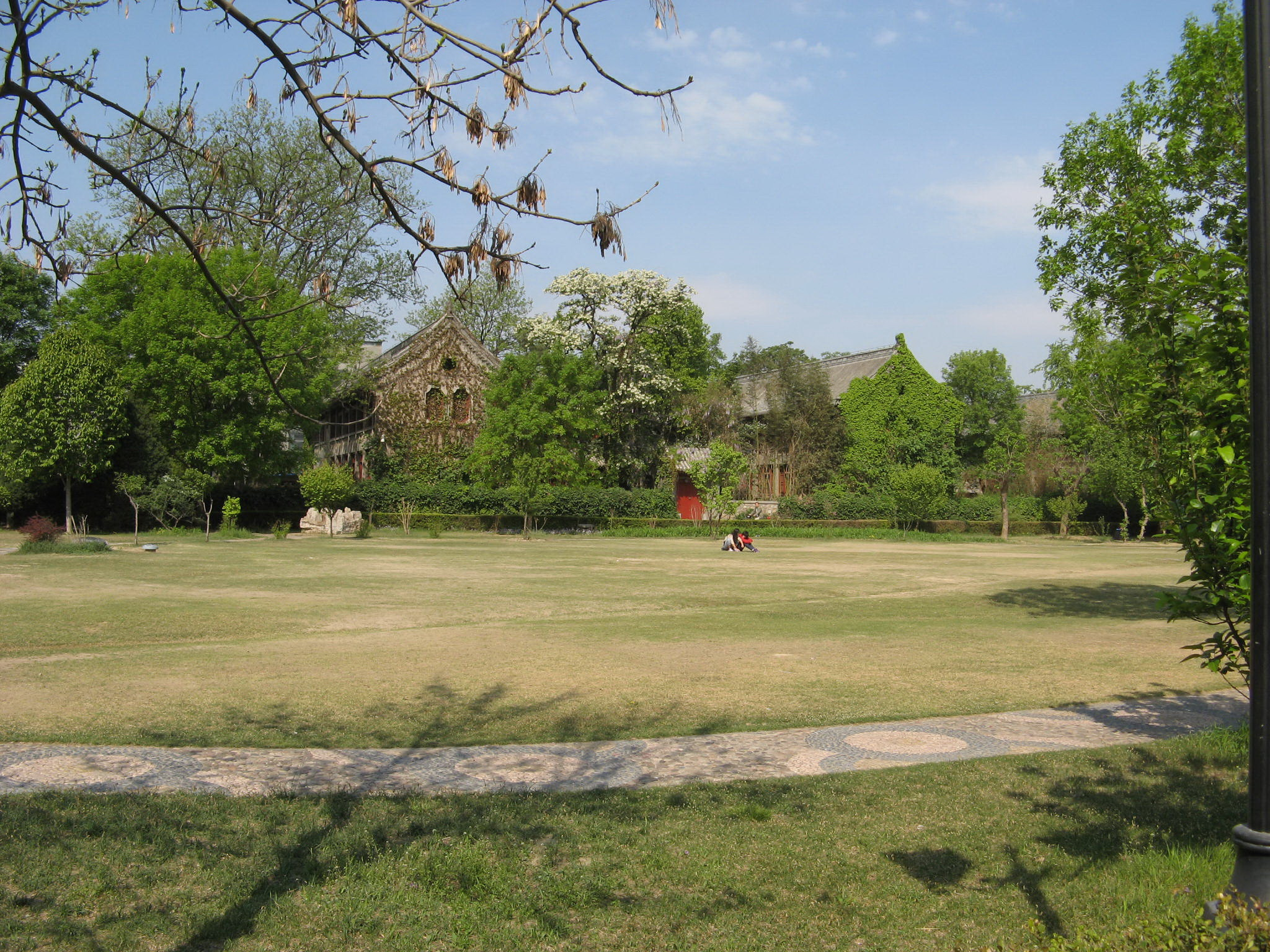
The buildings of the Jingyuan Garden, where the Yenching Academy is located

=== Curriculum ===
Studies at Yenching Academy are divided into mandatory core modules and electives. The core modules are "China in Transition", "Field Study", "Topics in China Studies Lecture Series", and "Compulsory Language Courses". Native Chinese are required to take additional courses in politics and foreign language. The electives are mostly divided into several research areas.

Yenching Academy allows students to pursue a degree in one of 6 different majors. The available majors are "Politics and International Relations", "Economics and Management", "Law and Society", "Philosophy and Religion", "History and Archaeology", and "Literature and Culture". Courses from these fields can be combined freely based on the scholar's research interest. The final degree depends on the topic chosen for the research thesis written and defended in year two.

Yenching Academy offers a host of Yenching-specific courses and electives for the scholars taught by Yenching faculty members selected across the Peking University campus and abroad (for example, He Yafei, the Former Vice Minister of Foreign Affairs of China, currently teaches a Yenching course on Chinese diplomacy). Yenching scholars are also offered a wide range of courses from most other schools and departments at Peking University, including Guanghua School of Management, National School of Development, as well as joint programs like the LSE-PKU Master in International Affairs. For scholars with a Chinese proficiency of HSK6, this also extends to courses taught in Chinese.

Furthermore, Yenching Academy invites leading personalities of diverse fields including art, literature, business, and politics as guest speakers throughout the program.

== Yenching Campus ==
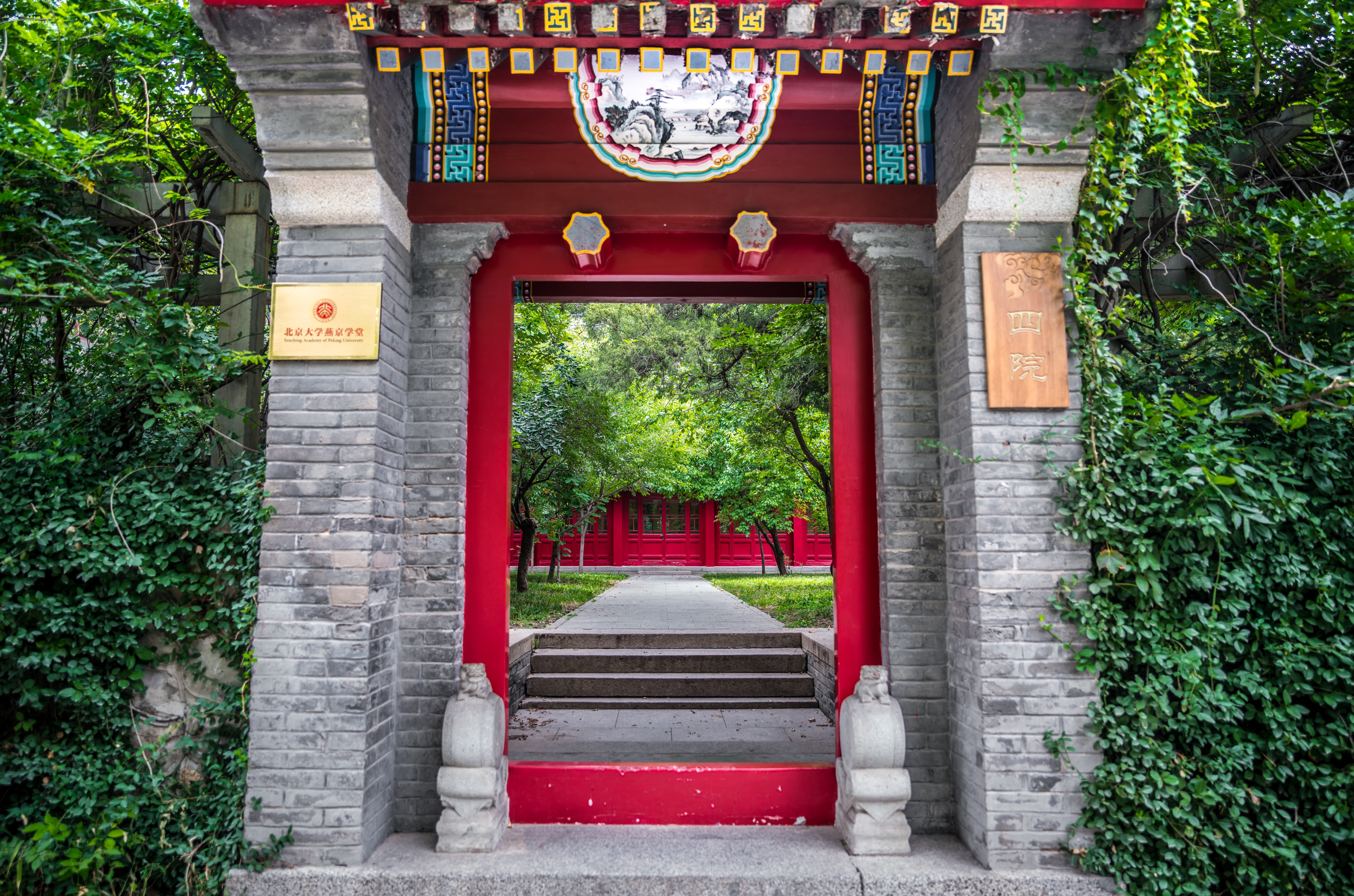
Entrance to Yenching Academy's main teaching buildings

=== Grounds ===
Yenching Academy's campus is located in the core of Peking University, specifically in Jing Yuan, an ancient Imperial Garden considered to the university's "historic and symbolic heart." It features six above-ground heritage buildings and a new ground-level complex which will stretch down multiple stories with access points and skylights throughout the garden.

=== Buildings ===
With feedback from the university community, the campus was designed by Gerald Szeto and Ping Mo, Beijing-based architects at Mo Atelier Szeto, who also designed the recently completed Stanford Center at Peking University. Previously at I. M. Pei & Associates, Szeto has 20 years of experience and is known for iconic structures such as the Bank of China Tower in Hong Kong, the Bank of China Head Office Building in Beijing, the Suzhou Museum and the Chancery Building for the Embassy of the People's Republic of China to the United States in Washington, DC, US.

== History ==
=== Announcement ===
Yenching Academy was announced in 2014 and established in 2015 by Peking University. It is expected the program will eventually grow from 100 students in the inaugural year to 200 students.

=== Competition ===
==== Funds ====
While Tsinghua's Schwarzman Scholarship expects to raise about US$550 million (originally 300 million) from mostly foreign donors for its endowment, it is understood that the endowment for Peking's Yenching Scholarship is even better funded through significant donations from Chinese philanthropists and special grants from the Chinese Central Government. For comparison, Oxford's Rhodes Scholarship endowment is currently raising funds to increase its endowment from about US$150 million to at least 200 million, as it expands to be more geographically inclusive (the other leadership programs covered the whole world from their inceptions). Meanwhile, Cambridge's Gates Scholarship endowment currently stands at about US$210 million, its original starting point. As a result of the increased competition among full-scholarship leadership programs, there has been marked growth in fundraising, with the endowments moving towards a half billion USD each. In 2016, Stanford University announced a competing program, Knight-Hennessy Scholars, backed by a US$750 million endowment.

==== Programs ====
One major difference between the Yenching and Schwarzman scholarships and the Rhodes and Gates scholarships is that in the former two programs, scholars will be studying in an interdisciplinary residential community created for the program, whereas the latter two programs merely offer a scholarship to study in a regular program with other students at that university.

Upon graduation, graduates will receive one of the following degrees: Master of Law (Politics & International Relations, Law & Society); Master of Economics (Economics & Management); Master of History (History & Archaeology); Master of Literature (Literature and Culture); or Master of Philosophy in China Studies (Philosophy & Religion)The first cohort of scholars have taken a range of paths. Roughly 30% continued to Ph.D. level studies at esteemed universities, while others are employed by Goldman Sachs, McKinsey & Company, Google, J.P. Morgan & Co., the Associated Press, the Boston Consulting Group, General Electric, HNA Group, NEO blockchain, Bank of Korea, the Chinese Ministry of Commerce, and more. All Yenching Scholars write a Master's thesis under the guidance of an adviser and defend it orally before an academic committee. In addition to a fully funded scholarship, scholars also receive a monthly stipend of $500 and round-trip airfare.

=== Controversy ===
Many of the Yenching program's features have generated controversy in China. The continued introduction of English courses, which in other colleges at Peking already make up a significant proportion of the courses offered, has drawn criticism for not being inclusive enough of Chinese culture. Additionally, the usage of the central Jing Yuan raised protests from students who were against the development of green spaces on campus. Graduate students at Peking have also found the shorter duration of the Yenching master's degrees to be unfair and expressed concern that Yenching degrees may eclipse their own in prestige. Students also found it unfair that the leadership program would allow interdisciplinary studies, which is still a rarity in China. Likewise, professors have been vocal about the inequity that Yenching professors will introduce to the professoriate.

The reaction among students and professors at Peking to the Yenching announcement is rather illustrative of the politically engaged open-minded nature of the university, where students historically played a major part in the New Culture Movement, May Fourth Movement, Tiananmen Square protest of 1989 and other significant events. In comparison, the reaction at Tsinghua to the Schwarzman program was rather muted, exemplifying its historical character as a politically correct technocratic school.

=== Launch ===
The scholarship program was developed with the strong support of leaders from top universities worldwide, including the present and past presidents of Stanford University, Cambridge University, Brown University, National University of Singapore (NUS), King Abdullah University of Science and Technology (KAUST), the Harvard-Yenching Institute, and Peking University itself. The program was announced on 2014 May 5 at the Yingjie Overseas Exchange Center at Peking University with representatives — including 30 university presidents and 45 university vice presidents — from about 50 leading universities worldwide, such as Stanford University, the University of Chicago, the London School of Economics (LSE), Heidelberg University, Melbourne University, National University of Singapore (NUS), Tokyo University, Waseda University, Renmin University, Fudan University, and Zhejiang University, attending the ceremony. At the ceremony, Yenching Academy was inaugurated by Zhu Shanlu, former party chief of Peking University, and Wang Enge, former President of Peking University, along with prominent alumni and donors.

=== Motivation ===
==== International presence ====
The Yenching and Schwarzman Scholarship programs were designed to increase the global profile of Peking and Tsinghua, the two leading Chinese universities, "as the country seeks more influence in global education and greater international prestige befitting its economic rise." As China has become the world's largest country not only by population but also by production (GDP), it wants to develop an academic system equal to that stature. To do so, the programs will allow both universities to offer more courses bilingually (Chinese and English), while supporting their efforts to attract top students from around the world. Additionally, the interdisciplinary nature of the programs will allow the universities to further innovate their curriculums to be broader and more adaptive. Based on the colleges' endowments, class sizes, and exceptionally low student-to-professor ratios (about 1:1), it is expected that pay for professors will compete with those at top institutions worldwide, such as the Ivy League, on a nominal exchange basis, while top Chinese universities currently pay on par on a purchasing power basis. This will enable the universities to attract top academics from around the world, as the universities continue with reforms to compete with academic institutions worldwide.

== Yenching Global Symposium ==
The Yenching Global Symposium (YGS) is an annual conference organized and hosted by current Yenching scholars in collaboration with Peking University. The Yenching Global Symposium provides a platform for emerging leaders, established practitioners, and Yenching Scholars from around the globe to engage in interdisciplinary dialogues on China through the unique lens of the Yenching Academy of Peking University.

Each year, the Symposium welcomes representatives from prestigious academic programs such as the Rhodes Scholars, Marshall Scholars, Gates Cambridge Scholars, Fulbright Scholars and other major fellowship recipients, as well as outstanding young professionals from the world's leading institutions. In March 2019, the conference drew delegates from 47 different countries. Past conference themes included Women 我们: Retelling the China Stories, Renaissance: China's Journey in a Global Future, Xinnovation: Identity of Innovation in China and China Meets the World, the World Comes to China.

The first annual YGS took place in 2016, with the theme of "China Meets the World, The World Comes to China". Notable speakers included Ken Jarrett, President of the American Chamber of Commerce; Hervé Machenaud, Chief Representative and Chairman of EDF China; Kaiser Kuo, founder of SupChina; He Yafei, former Vice-Minister of the Chinese Ministry of Foreign Affairs; and Yuan Ming, Dean of the Yenching Academy.

The 2017 YGS followed the theme of "Xinnovation: Identity of Innovation in China." Notable speakers included artist Liu Bolin and entrepreneurs Mao Daqing and Eric Li.

The 2018 iteration of the Symposium was "Renaissance: China's Journey in a Global Future." This multidimensional theme incorporated four meanings of the Chinese character, ren: people, cognition, responsibility, and benevolence.

The 2019 YGS theme was "Wǒmen: Retelling the China Stories," and analyzed key current narratives on China through a gendered lens. Notable speakers included Liu Xin, CGTN TV Host, and Susan Shirk, former Deputy Assistant Secretary of State during the Clinton administration.

The theme of YGS 2020 was Sino-Sustainability: Reimagining Global Solutions. As China's interaction with the wider international community continues to develop, the two will need to redefine approaches to the world's long-term sustainability challenges. Sino-Sustainability: Reimagining Global Solutions would have explored how China's experiences could impact the rest of the world by examining China's approaches in fulfilling demand, allocating resources, and pursuing longevity. The conference was canceled due to the coronavirus pandemic.

The 2021 YGS theme was "Shared Renewal: Recoupling East with West."(中文: 同舟共济, 再创未来)Designed with global divisions and shared challenges such as the COVID-19 pandemic in mind, the theme explored the sub-themes of "Reflection," "Resilience," and "Recovery," incorporating the letters "Re" into the Chinese character 同 in the logo.

The 2022 YGS theme was "Guóbalisation or Globalisation? Internationalism in Flux." The conference explored nationalism, globalisation and multilateralism through three days of programming, "looking inwards," "looking outwards," and "looking forwards."

The 2023 YGS theme was "互manity: Cartographies of Collaboration." The first time held outside of Beijing in Hainan, this conference promoted mutual understanding and advanced collaboration among three key areas: Geographical Affinity, Cultural Affinity, and Human Affinity.

The symposium draws on renowned speakers from academia, politics, industry, business, and other experts in related fields. Past opening keynote speakers were senior CGTN host Liu Xin, one of the channel's signature anchors, covering many major events in China and around the world. Other past speakers include author Adeline Yen Mah, Development Reimagined CEO Hannah Ryder, gender and economy researcher Dr. Alicia Giron, former career British diplomat Carma Elliot, and Director of Productions at Twentieth Century Fox Film Xiaoting Huo.

== Leadership and governance ==
Peking University Yenching Academy has assembled an advisory council of leading academics and university administrators to lead and support the academy and its Scholars. The academy's executive administration is mostly drawn from other colleges and departments of Peking University.

=== Executive administration ===
- Honorary Dean Yuan Ming, Director, Center for American Studies, Professor of International Relations, Peking University (Ph.D. Peking University)
- Dean Dong Qiang, Knight of the Legion d'honneur of France, Chair, Department of French, Peking University, Professor at the School of Foreign Languages, Peking University
- Associate Dean Bo Wang, Head, Department of Philosophy & Professor of Philosophy, Peking University (Ph.D. Peking University)
- Associate Dean Hongbin Cai, Dean, Guanghua School of Management & Professor of Economics, Peking University (Ph.D. Stanford University)
- Associate Dean John Holden, Past President, National Committee on U.S.-China Relations; former chairman, Cargill China (M.A. Stanford University)
- Associate Dean Guohua Jiang, Graduate School & Professor of Accounting, Peking University (Ph.D. University of California, Berkeley)
- Director of Graduate Studies Lu Yang, Professor, Department of History (Ph.D. Princeton University)

=== International academic advisory council ===
- Gerhard Casper, president emeritus and professor emeritus, and senior fellow at the Freeman Spogli Institute for International Studies, Stanford University
- Elizabeth Perry, Henry Rosovsky Professor of Government at Harvard University and director, Harvard-Yenching Institute
- Alison Richard, senior research scientist and professor emerita, Yale University and Vice-chancellor Emerita, Cambridge University
- Ruth Simmons, professor and president emerita, Brown University
- Shih Choon Fong, university professor and president emeritus, National University of Singapore (NUS) and president emeritus, King Abdullah University of Science and Technology (KAUST)
- Michael Spence, professor, New York University Stern School of Business; senior fellow, Stanford University Hoover Institution; dean emeritus, Stanford University Business School; Nobel Laureate in Economics; and Oxford Rhodes Scholar
- Henry Yang, chancellor, University of California Santa Barbara
- Zhang Xudong, professor of comparative literature and professor of East Asian studies, New York University; Cheung Kong Chair Professor of Chinese Literature, Peking University
