= Tsinghua University School of Public Policy and Management =

Public policy school of Tsinghua University

School of Public Policy and Management
- 清华大学公共管理学院
- Established: 2000; 26 years ago
- Dean: Jiang XiaoJuan
- Academic staff: 62 (Full-time Faculty)
- Location: Beijing, China; 39.9974°N 116.3254°E
- Campus: Urban
- Website: http://www.sppm.tsinghua.edu.cn

Chinese name
- Simplified Chinese: 清华大学公共管理学院
- Traditional Chinese: 清華大學公共管理學院
Transcriptions
Standard Mandarin
- Hanyu Pinyin: Qīnghuá Dàxué Gōnggòng Guǎnlǐ Xuéyuàn

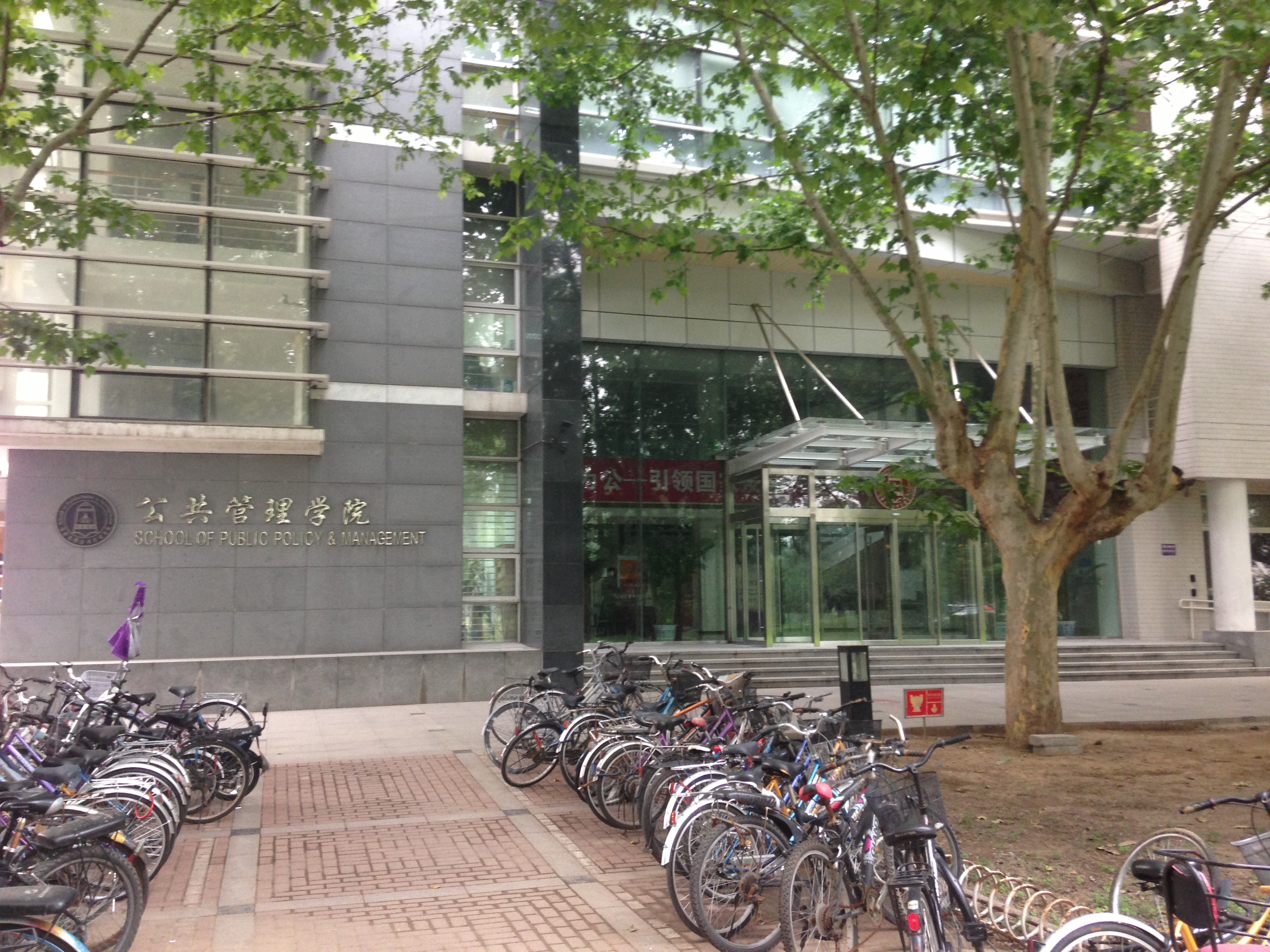
Front entrance to the School of Public Policy and Management at Tsinghua University.

The School of Public Policy and Management (SPPM) at Tsinghua University is a public policy and public administration school located in Beijing, China. SPPM is headquartered in the Wu Shunde Building on Zhongguancun East Road on the university mall between the Tsinghua University School of Economics and Management to its north and the Journalism and Communication to its south. The school offers Master and Doctoral educational programmes.

== Academics ==
It was founded in 2000. The School offers a two-year Master of Public Administration in International Development and a taught in English and geared to international students. A one-year International Master in Public Administration (IMPA) course is offered by the school that is aimed at giving additional training to government officials from developing countries. The Master of Public Policy (MPP) program is also a two-year program offered by the school that aims at preparing students for careers in the public sector. It also offers a two-year Master's in Public Administration which is entirely taught in Mandarin. A PhD in Public Management is also offered at the school.

== Research centres ==
- Health and Development Institute
- Center for Industrial Development and Environmental Governance
- Center for China Studies (CCS)
- Institute of Government Management and Innovation (IGMI)
- Center for Crisis Management Research (CCMR)
- Public Policy Institute
- Brookings-Tsinghua Center for Public Policy
- The Center for Innovation and Social Responsibility
- Institute of Taiwan Studies (ITS)
- NGO Research Center
- Center for Anti-corruption and Governance

== Notable SPPM faculty ==
- Xue Lan
- Xiaojuan Jiang
- Cui Zhiyuan
