= He Yafei =

Chinese diplomat

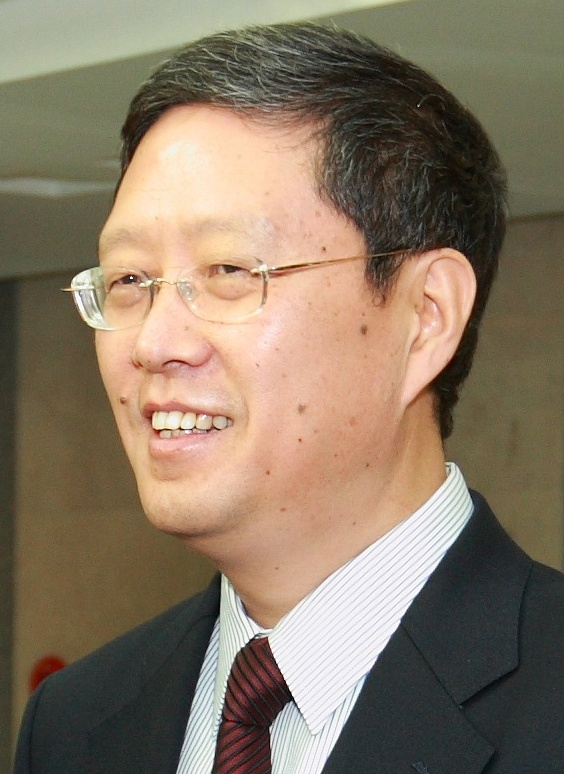
He Yafei in 2009

He Yafei (Chinese: 何亚非) (born 1955) is a Chinese diplomat who was vice-minister of the Ministry of Foreign Affairs from 2008 to 2009.

== Biography ==
He Yafei was born in 1955 and is a native of Ningbo, Zhejiang province. He completed studies at the Graduate Institute of International Studies in Geneva, Switzerland and holds a master's degree. He is a lifelong diplomat. In 2008, he became vice-minister of the Ministry of Foreign Affairs. His responsibilities included: North America and Oceania, international organizations and conferences, arms control, protocol, Hong Kong, Macao and Taiwan-related foreign affairs. He is married and has one daughter. He represented China during the negotiations of the Copenhagen Accord in December 2009. Between 2010 and 2012, he served as the ambassador of China to the United Nations Office in Geneva, and representative to other international organizations in Switzerland.

He was appointed a distinguished professor by Yenching Academy of Peking University in 2016. In 2023, he was co-chairman of the Center for China and Globalization, a think tank based in Beijing.

== Views ==
He stated in 2010 that China's relations with developing countries should be the "bedrock and strategic focus on China's major-country diplomacy." In He's view, China's relations with developing countries will continue to develop as those countries narrow the gap between their capabilities and those of the developed countries. He describes China as building relations with developing countries that seek a "multi-polar world and democratic international relations" and the "reform of global governance."

In his book China and Global Governance, He writes that the structure of global governance should be reshaped on the basis of harmony. Observing that current global governance lacks the influence of Marxism and elements of traditional Chinese thought like Confucianism, He writes that China can contribute to improving global governance by sharing these Chinese norms through the Chinese Dream and the Belt and Road Initiative.
