= Ping Mo =

Chinese architect

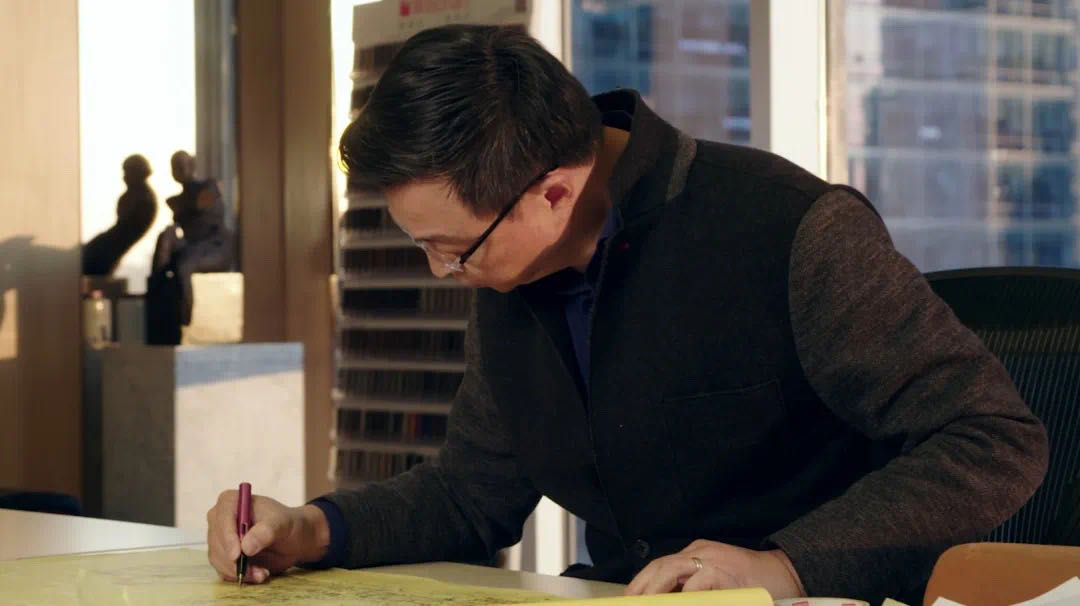
- Born: 1962 (age 63–64)
- Other name: 莫平
- Education: Beijing University of Civil Engineering and Architecture, Harvard Graduate School of Design
- Occupation: Architect
- Practice: Mo Atelier Szeto

Ping Mo (Chinese: 莫平; pinyin: Mò Píng; born 1962 in Beijing) is an architect and the founder of Mo Atelier Szeto, an architectural design firm established in 2005.

== Early life and education ==
Born in Beijing in 1962, Mo grew up apprenticing in the art studio of his father, the renowned Chinese woodcut artist Mo Ce. In 1984, he received his Bachelor's Degree from Beijing University of Civil Engineering and Architecture. After teaching for two years, he left Beijing for Cambridge, Massachusetts and received his Master of Architecture I degree from Harvard Graduate School of Design in 1990.

== Career ==
After graduating from Harvard's GSD, Ping worked in Graham Gund Architects in Boston Massachusetts for five years (1990-1995). He joined Pei Partnership Architects (PPA) in 1995 as an architect in New York City. In 1998, Mo was appointed by I. M. Pei to manage on site the design and construction of Pei's Bank of China Beijing Headquarters project. As the project's residential architect, Mo assumed the role of Managing Director for PPA in Asia from 2002 to 2005, overseeing the development of more projects in China for the firm. In 2005, Mo left PPA and founded his own architectural practice Mo Atelier (莫平建筑设计顾问事务所). He was later joined by the architect Gerald Szeto as partner, forming the architectural practice now known as Mo Atelier Szeto (MAS).

Since 2005, MAS has offered a diverse range of design services, such as master-planning, architectural design and interior design for a wide variety of projects in China across educational, healthcare, corporate and cultural sectors.

== Signature projects ==
- United World College Changshu Campus （世界联合学院，中国常熟校园)
- Taikang Senior Citizens Retirement Center, Shu and Wu Gardens （泰康 蜀园，吴园）
- Stanford Center at Peking University (MAS) （北京大学 斯坦福中心)
- ECNU Xiping Bilingual School Campus, Xiamen, China (厦门市华师希平双语学校)
- Yenching Academy of Peking University (MAS) (燕京学堂，北京大学)
- Peking Union Medical College Hospital, China Medical Board's China HQ Office （北京协和医院，美国中华医药基金会 北京办事处）
- The Library of Health Science Center, Peking University （北京大学，医学部图书馆）
- International Medical Services Campus, at Peking Union Medical College Hospital (北京协和医院 新国际医疗区）
- Hall of Rectitude, Palace Museum (MAS) （故宫博物院 中正殿)
- The Garden of The Palace of Established Happiness, The Palace Museum, Forbidden City (MAS) （故宫建福宫花园）
