= Brazilian Civil Rights Framework for the Internet =

Brazilian Civil Rights Framework for the Internet (in Portuguese: Marco Civil da Internet, officially (Federal) Law No 12.965/2014) is the law that governs the use of the Internet in Brazil and sets out guidelines for state action and rights and duties for users and operators.

The bill was approved by the Brazilian Congress Câmara dos Deputados on March 25, 2014 and was submitted to the Senado Federal. The Marco Civil was approved by the Brazilian Senate on April 22, 2014 and signed into law by president Dilma Rousseff on April 23, 2014, at the Global Multistakeholder Meeting on the Future of Internet Governance.

== History ==
The project was created in partnership between the Ministry of Justice and the Center for Technology and Society of the Law School at the Fundação Getúlio Vargas, at the time directed by professor Ronaldo Lemos. Both institutions launched on October 29, 2009 the first draft phase of a collaborative process to build the draft for the Marco Civil. The Marco Civil is aimed at protecting privacy rights, net neutrality, safe-harbors for internet service providers and online service providers, open government, and setting forth that access to the internet is a requisite to the exercise for civic rights.

The first round of the draft took place between October 29 and December 17, 2009. More than 800 substantive contributions were received, including comments, e-mails, alternative drafts and references. The conception of the Marco Civil was originally created by professor Ronaldo Lemos, in an article published on May 22, 2007.

Following the first round of discussions, the draft was published for public comments, throughout a collaborative process. The debates of the second phase took place between April 8 and May 30, 2010.

On August 24, 2011, the draft bill was not only approved by the Executive Government in Brazil through the Brazilian Presidency, but also sent to Congress by President Dilma Rousseff, with the support of four Ministries (Justice, Science & Technology, Planning, and Communications). In Congress, the draft bill was received and processed under docket number 2126/2011.

The Marco Civil was described by the then Ministry of Justice, Luiz Paulo Barreto as "The Constitution of the Internet" in Brazil.

The project was scheduled to be voted several times in November 2012.

An English/Portuguese translation, with changes marked in the Portuguese, was published circa November 18, 2013.

As a reaction to the allegations of NSA monitoring Brazil's telecoms networks, passing the Marco Civil (which is often called "The Internet Constitution" in Brazil) has become a priority reaction for the Brazilian Government, as affirmed by President Dilma Rousseff during her speech to the 68th Session of the United Nations General Assembly, on September 24, 2013.

An unofficial translation into English was made available by Paulo Rená in March 2014.

== Controversy ==
In 2012 the National Association of Federal Police Chiefs issued a press release arguing the law was unconstitutional.

== English Version of the approved Marco Civil ==
The approved law was translated into English by Carolina Rossini and distributed to all participants of the Global Multistakeholder Meeting on the Future of Internet Governance. This final version of April 2014 is available at publicknowledge.org.

The Chamber of Deputies has also made an English translation available.
