= Xue Lan =

Chinese public policy scholar (born 1959)

Xue Lan 薛澜
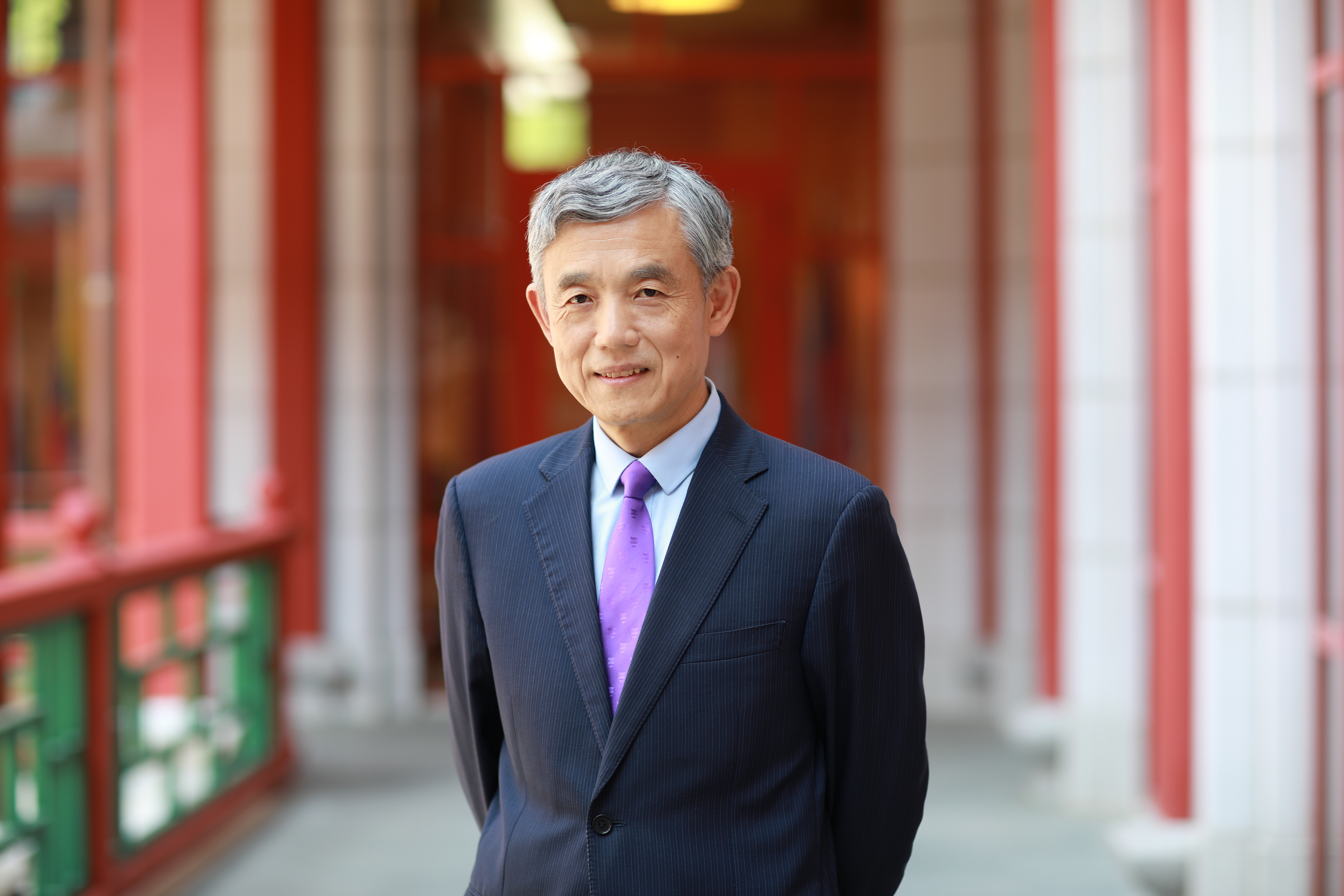
- Born: 25 June 1959 (age 66); Beijing, People's Republic of China
- Citizenship: China
- Education: Changchun Institute of Optics; State University of New York (MS, MPA); Carnegie Mellon University (PhD)
- Organization(s): Carnegie Mellon University, Brookings Institution, George Washington University, Tsinghua University

Xue Lan (Chinese: 薛澜) is a Chinese public policy scholar. He is a Cheung Kong Distinguished Chair Professor and the dean of Schwarzman College at Tsinghua University, where he also serves as the director of the Institute for AI International Governance and co-director of the Institute for Sustainable Development Goals. He is noted for both his positions on many research and educational councils as well as his work in global governance, crisis management, and science, technology and innovation policy. He serves on the editorial board of many international and domestic journals. He also frequently consults for the central and local governments in China and governments and international organizations abroad.

Xue received his Ph.D. in engineering and public policy from Carnegie Mellon University in 1991 and taught at George Washington University as an assistant professor before returning to Tsinghua University in 1996. From 2000-2018, he served as associate dean, executive associate dean, and dean of the School of Public Policy and Management at Tsinghua University.

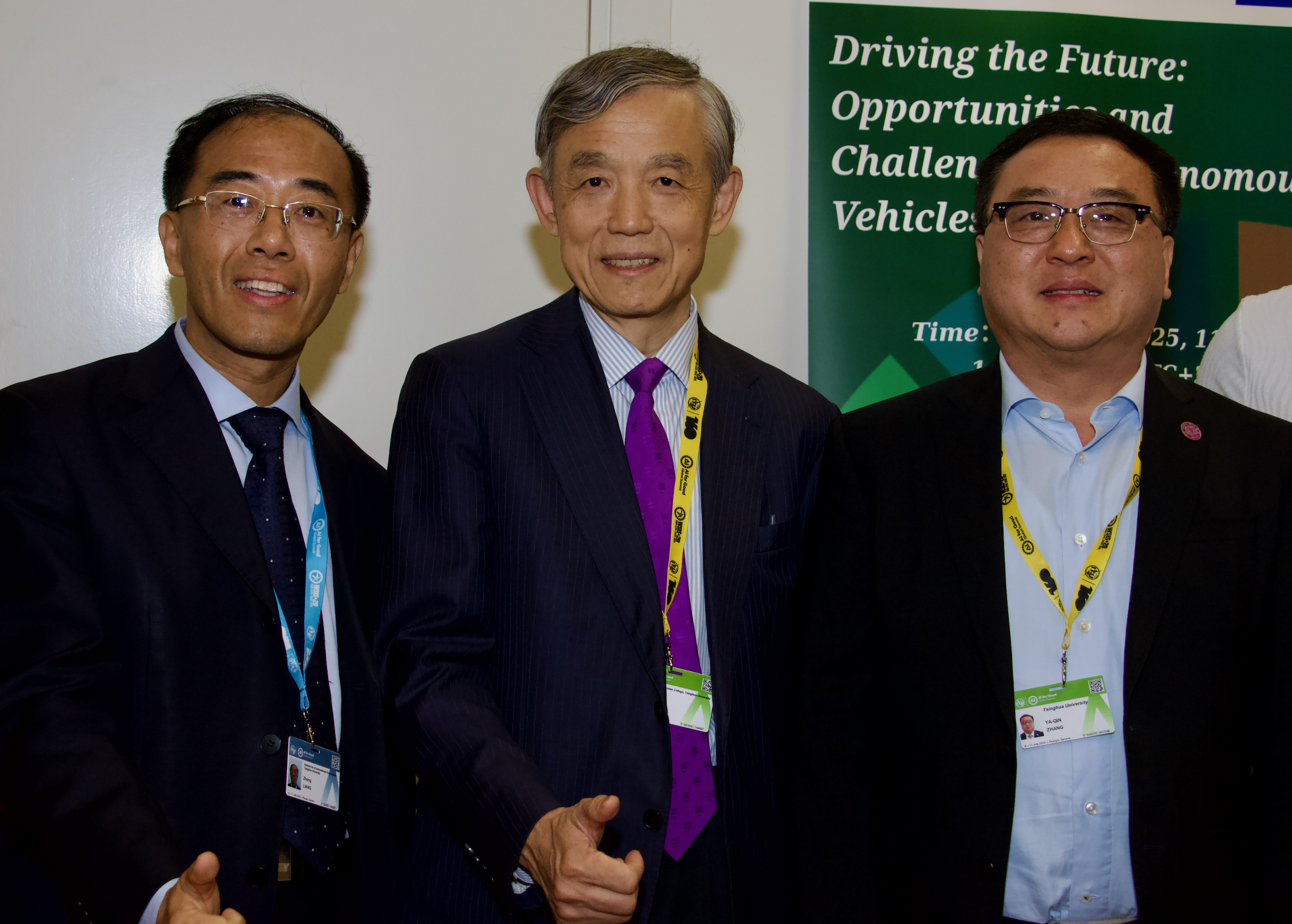
Liang Zheng, Lan, Ya-Qin Zhang at AI for Good (2025)

Xue also serves as the director of China's National Expert Committee on Next Generation AI governance, a member of United Nations Committee of Experts on Public Administration, a member of Internet Governance Forum Leadership Panel, and a board member of Sustainable Development Solutions Network (SDSN). He is an adjunct professor at Carnegie Mellon University and a non-resident senior fellow of Brookings Institution.

Xue is a recipient of the National Medal of Innovation Excellence, the Distinguished Contribution Award from the Chinese Association of Science and Technology Policy, and the Fudan Distinguished Contribution Award for Management Science.

== Publications ==
Dr. Xue Lan has published extensively in public policy and management, science and technology policy, crisis management, and global governance, both in Chinese and English.

Selected Works:

- Xue L, et al (2022). Crisis Management in China : Challenges of the Transition. Springer ISBN 978-981-16-8706-8
- Xue L, Zeng G (2019). A Comprehensive Evaluation on Emergency Response in China. Springer ISBN 978-981-13-0644-0
- Weng L, Sayer J A, Xue L. Will China redefine development patterns in Africa? Evidence from Cameroon. The Extractive Industries and Society, 2017.
- Lan Xue. The Shifting Global Order: A Dangerous Transition or an Era of Opportunity?. Governance,|Volume 25, Issue 4, pages 539–541, October 2012.
