= Carolina Rossini =

Attorney

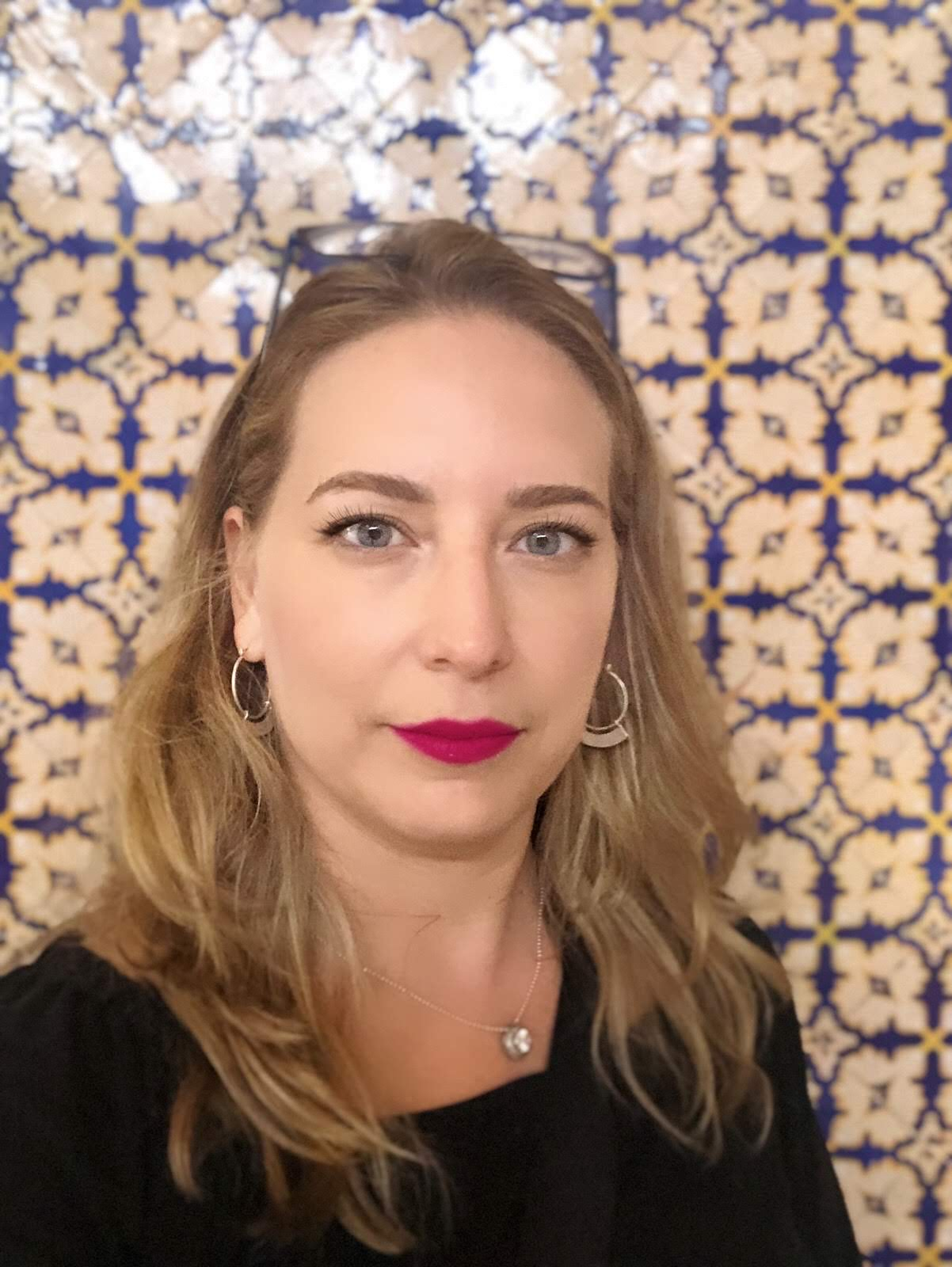
- Carolina Rossini at Rights Con Tunis in 2019
- Born: São Paulo - Brazil

Carolina Rossini is a Brazilian-American attorney who focuses on intellectual property, open standard, and data privacy. She is notable for her work in intellectual property law in her native Brazil. In 2016, she was selected as a Young Global Leader by the World Economic Forum.

== Biography ==
Rossini was born in São Paulo, Brazil. She speaks and writes English, Spanish and her native Portuguese.

Rossini holds an LL.M in Intellectual Property from Boston University, and degrees from the Sao Paulo State University-UNESP (Master in International Negotiations), University of Sao Paulo (Bachelor in Law), and Instituto de Empresa-IE (MBA in E-Business).

She is married to John Wilbanks.

== Career ==
Since 2000, Rossini has been a prominent figure within the development of ICT. On April 2, 2014, Rossini was called to the United States House of Representatives to discuss the proposed transfer of the IANA stewardship from the United States.

Rossini also played an important role in the Marco Civil legislation passed in 2014 in her native Brazil, as she was the key translator of the approved law from Portuguese to English.

An attorney by trade, Rossini has held various positions with leading technology companies and think tanks such as: Facebook, New America, Public Knowledge, and the Electronic Frontier Foundation.

== Bibliography ==
- Puddephatt, Andrew; Rossini, Carolina; Zausmer, Rebecca (2014). Defining Indicators of Internet Development (PDF). UNESCO.
- Rossini, Carolina (2007). The Open Access Movement: opportunities and challenges for developing countries. Let them live in interesting times. Diplo Foundation.
- Rossini, Carolina; Brito Cruz, Francisco; Doneda, Danilo (2015). The Strengths and Weaknesses of the Brazilian Internet Bill of Rights: Examining a Human Rights Framework for the Internet. Centre for International Governance Innovation.

== Rossini in the media ==
- Hollywood Lobbyist Hasn't Seen The TPP Text, Cannot Read The TPP Text, But Knows What's in the TPP Text?
- What is the Trans-Pacific Partnership and why are Critics Upset by it?
- US Congressional Push For Release of TPP Text; US Pressuring Nations Bilaterally?
