= Escritório Central de Arrecadação e Distribuição =

Brazilian national copyright collection agency

Logo of ECAD.

The Escritório Central de Arrecadação e Distribuição (also known as ECAD; can be translated as Central Bureau for Collection and Distribution) is the national copyright collection agency in Brazil. It is made up of six partner organisations: ABRAMUS, AMAR, ASSIM, SBACEM, SICAM, SOCINPRO and UBC.

ECAD also produce a Radio Ranking of music based on radio airplay.

== Controversies ==
In 2012, fifteen officials were indicted after an investigation by the Brazilian Senate found that some at ECAD had allegedly taken money intended for artists and had engaged in price fixing.

Ronaldo Lemos, an academic from Fundação Getúlio Vargas, has said he believes ECAD used legal pressure on their critics and described them as a "litigation machine". Lemos claimed that leaked documents from ECAD showed that they planned to sue him.
