= Schwarzman College =

Residential college of Tsinghua University

Tsinghua University Schwarzman College
- 清华大学苏世民书院
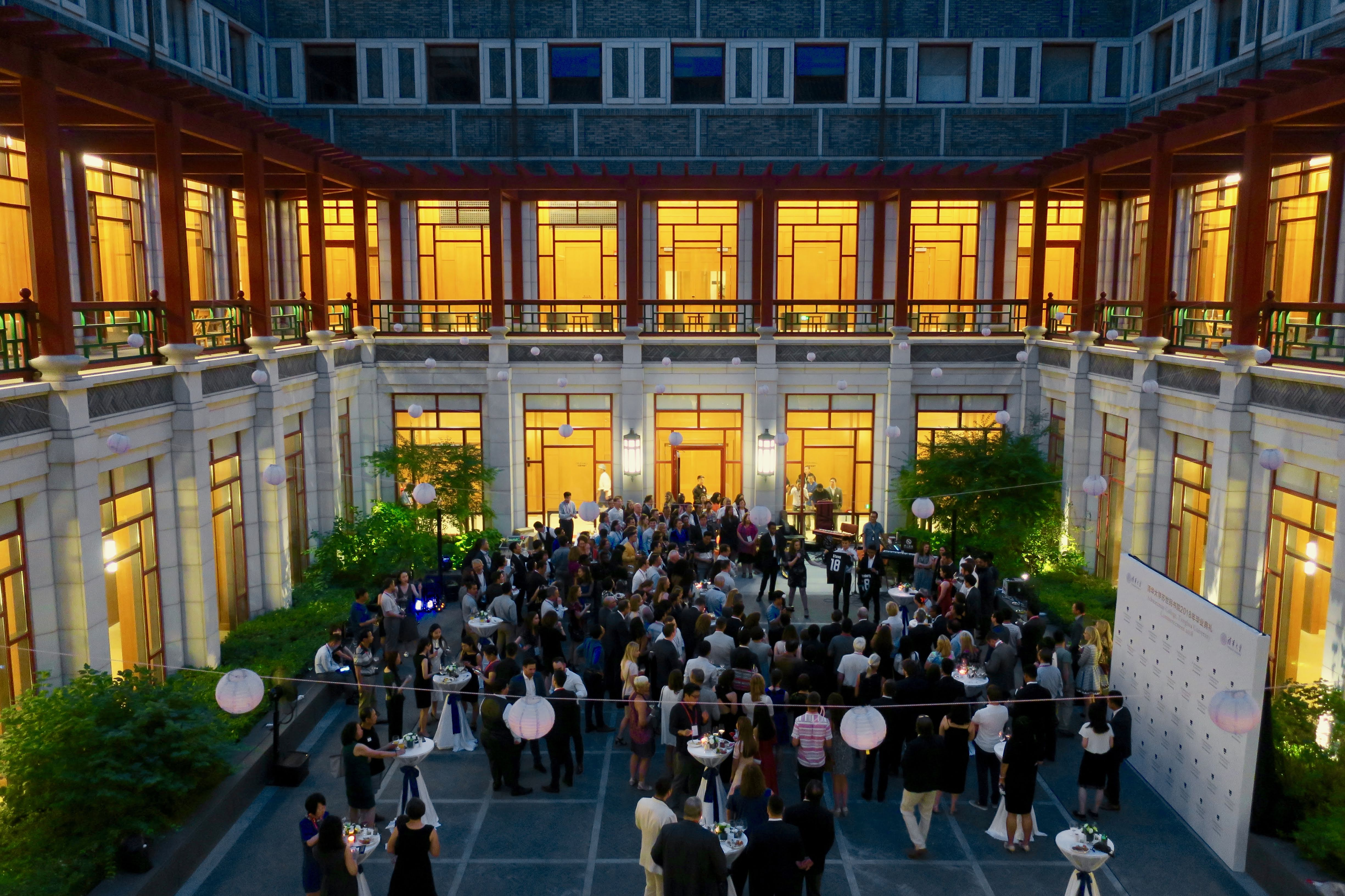
- Schwarzman College Interior Courtyard in 2018

General information
- Architectural style: Classical Chinese
- Location: Beijing, China
- Completed: 2016; 10 years ago

Design and construction
- Architect: Robert A. M. Stern
- Awards and prizes: LEED Gold Certification

Website
- sc.tsinghua.edu.cn

Chinese name
- Simplified Chinese: 苏世民书院
- Traditional Chinese: 蘇世民書院
Transcriptions
Standard Mandarin
- Hanyu Pinyin: Sūshìmín Shūyuàn

Schwarzman College is a residential college of Tsinghua University in Haidian, Beijing, China. It hosts the Schwarzman Scholars, a one-year master's degree program in global leadership.

The college building was completed in 2016 and designed by the American architect Robert A. M. Stern. It is the first academic building in China to have a LEED gold certification.

== Academics and scholarship ==
The college was founded to provide a residential college experience for Schwarzman Scholars. Students at the college study a one-year degree program of Master of Management in global leadership. During this time, the scholars live inside the Schwarzman College building.

Annually, 100–200 Schwarzman Scholars are chosen through a competitive selection process. All students admitted are fully funded by the university. Approximately 40% of the participants come from the United States, 20% from China, and the rest 40% from the rest of the world. Students apply directly to the program and do not require a nomination from their home universities.

== See also ==
- Yenching Scholars at Yenching Academy of Peking University
