= Chinese Public Administration Society =

Chinese academic institution

Chinese Public Administration Society (CPAS) is a nationwide academic institution, whose vocation is specialized in the research of administrative theories and practices, development of administrative sciences and promoting public services.

CPAS organizes research personnel engaged in administrative management throughout the country, and the relevant academic organizations and scientific research and teaching units. CPAS learns and uses the experiences of administrative management and sciences from other countries in the world, and promotes academic exchanges concerning administrative sciences with other countries. In addition, CPAS participates in international academic organizations and conducts foreign exchanges on behalf of the Chinese administrative circles.

The National Members' Congress of the CPAS is the highest organ of its power. The council members of the CPAS are elected at the National Members' Congress of the CPAS. The executive council members, chairman, vice-chairmen and secretary-general are elected at the CPAS Council Meeting. CPAS receives professional instructions and supervision of General Office of the State Council and Administration Center for Civil Institution Registration of the Ministry of Civil Affairs.

== See also ==
- China National School of Administration
- List of public administration schools
- School of Political Science and Public Administration, University of Electronic Science and Technology of China UESTC
- School of Public Administration, Renmin University (external)
- Department of Political Science and Public Administration Zhong Shan (SunYat-Sen) University
- Chinese Public Administration Review - external, American Society for Public Administration
