= 7amleh =

Palestinian nonprofit organization

- Types: community organization, nonprofit organization
- Legal status: amutah
- Country: Israel
- Coordinates: 32°49′08″N 34°59′47″E
- Website: 7amleh.org

7amleh, also known as the Arab Center for Social Media Advancement, is a digital rights and human rights activist group for Palestinians.

== Aims ==
7amleh is a non-profit citizens' association aiming at supporting and training Palestinian and Arab human rights and other civil society activists in online media coverage of the human rights of Palestinians. 7amleh also carries out advocacy for digital rights, the right to Internet access, and campaigning on Palestinian rights. Motivations for the creation of 7amleh include arbitrary arrest by Palestinian and Israeli authorities.

== Actions ==
In 2018, 7amleh estimated that 300 Palestinians had been arrested by Israeli authorities based on the monitoring of the Palestinians' Facebook and Twitter usage, using "forecasting police" to identify people who might carry out attacks against Israel.

In August 2020, 7amleh published an analysis of fake news in Palestine, with the aim of encouraging public debate about fake news and media literacy. The study, motivated by COVID-19 misinformation, was based on focus groups, a survey with 515 participants, and interviews with five experts in the monitoring of fake news. The study made recommendations for civil society and governmental organisations and for researchers based on its findings.

In September 2020, 7amleh argued that Emi Palmor, a former Israeli Ministry of Justice director general who became a member of Facebook's Oversight Board, was involved in censorship of Palestinian journalism and human rights defenders. 7amleh used the hashtags #FacebookCensorsPalestine and #DropEmiPalmor to attract online attention and to Facebook staff.

== Awards ==
7amleh was given the Index on Censorship 2020 award for digital activism.
