= Suzor =

Suzor is a surname. Notable people with the surname include:

- Mark Suzor (born 1956), Canadian ice hockey player
- Nicolas Suzor (fl. 2010s–2020s), Australian legal scholar
- Pavel Suzor (1844–1919), Russian architect
- Pierre Suzor (died 1801), schismatic bishop of the Archdiocese of Tours

== See also ==
- Marc-Aurèle de Foy Suzor-Coté (1869–1937), French Canadian painter and sculptor
