= Endy (name) =

Endy is a given name. Notable people with the given name include:

- Endy Bayuni (born 1957), Indonesian journalist
- Endy Opoku Bernadina (born 1995), Dutch footballer
- Endy Chávez (born 1978), Venezuelan former baseball outfielder
- Endy Chow (born 1979), Hong Kong actor, singer and songwriter
- Nwal-Endéné “Endy” Miyem (born 1988), French basketball player
- Endy Rodríguez (born 2000), Dominican baseball catcher
- Endy Semeleer (born 1995), Curaçaoan-Dutch kickboxer
