= Steve Neal =

Steve Neal may refer to:

- Stephen L. Neal (born 1934), U.S. Representative from North Carolina
- Steve Neal (historian) (1949–2004), American journalist and historian
- Stephen Neal (born 1976), American football player
- Stephen Neal (lawyer), American attorney
