= Kristina Arriaga =

American human rights advocate and diplomat

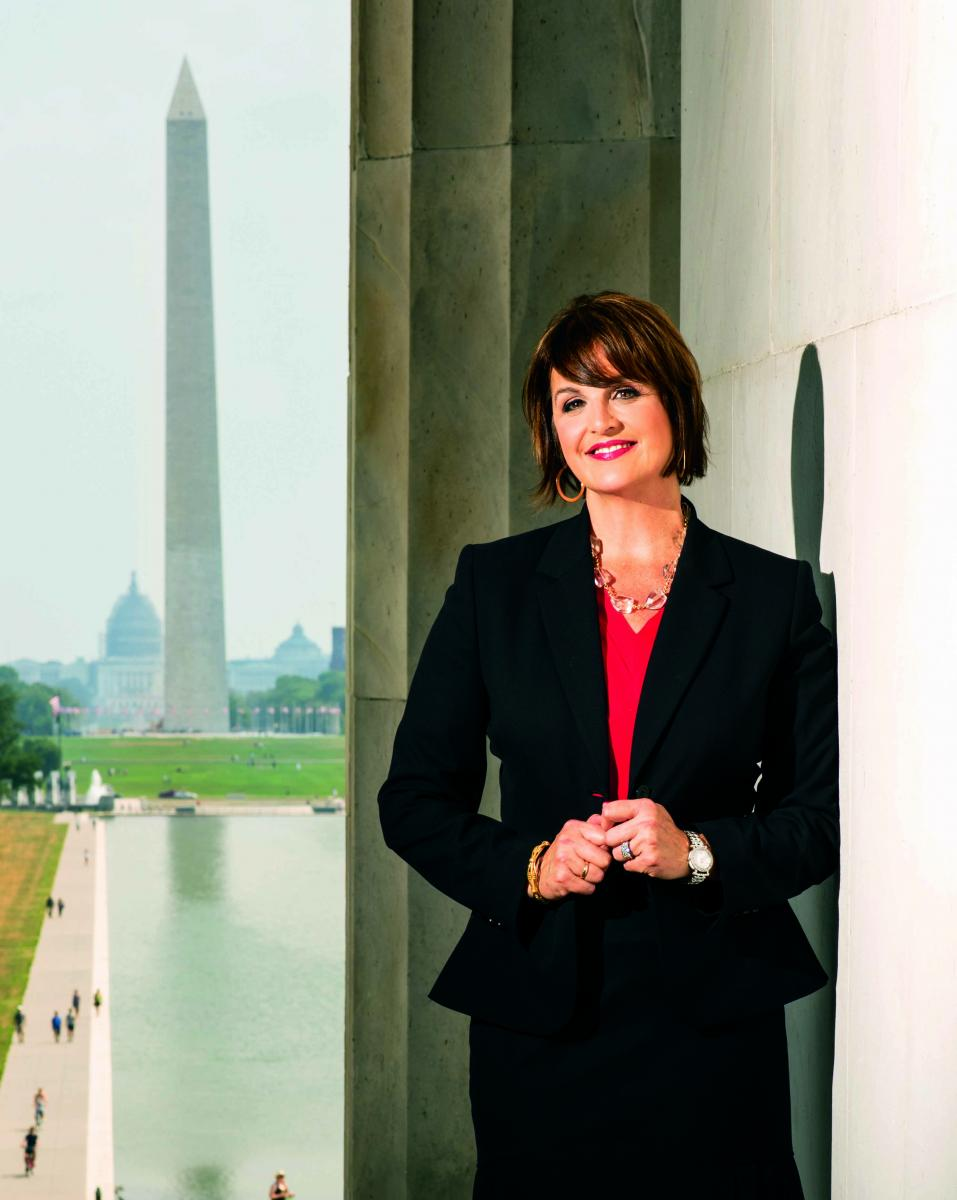

Vice Chair of the U.S. Commission on International Religious Freedom
- In office May 18, 2016 – November 15, 2019
- Appointed by: Paul Ryan
- Preceded by: Robert P. George

Personal details
- Spouse: Matthew Bucholz
- Children: 3
- Education: Marquette University (BA); Georgetown University (MA); University of Oxford

Kristina Arriaga de Bucholz is an American First Amendment and human rights advocate, former nonprofit executive, and diplomat who served as the executive director of the Becket Fund for Religious Liberty before being appointed in 2016 by Speaker of the United States House of Representatives Paul Ryan to the United States Commission on International Religious Freedom, where she was elected vice chair.

Her tenure at Becket was notable for the firm's successful representation of a number of clients in high profile religious liberty cases that reached the Supreme Court of the United States, including the landmark decision in Burwell v. Hobby Lobby Stores, Inc. (2014).

In 2020, she was appointed as a trustee of the Oversight Board, an independent body established by Meta to make content moderation decisions on the social media platforms Facebook, Instagram, and Threads. Since 2019, she has also been the CEO of Intrinsic, a public relations consulting firm.

== Early life and career ==
Arriaga graduated with a Bachelor of Arts degree from Marquette University in Milwaukee, Wisconsin, and later earned a Master of Arts degree from Georgetown University in Washington, D.C. As of 2024, she is described as a doctoral student in the Faculty of Law reading for a DPhil in jurisprudence at the University of Oxford.

Arriaga's early career included a role in the U.S. delegation to the UN Human Rights Commission in Geneva, Switzerland, where she first worked for U.S. Ambassador Armando Valladares in 1986. Later, as a member of the delegation, she would also meet Holocaust survivor Elie Wiesel while the three toured a museum of the French resistance housed in a building previously used by the Gestapo for torturing resistance members in Lyon, France during the Nazi occupation.

The three would again cross paths when the Becket Fund awarded Valladares with the 2016 Canterbury Medal at an annual dinner. Arriaga presented the medal to Valladares while Wiesel, himself a 1998 recipient of the Canterbury Medal, gave a speech honoring the contributions of Valladares to human rights and freedom of expression.

She later played a role in orchestrating the 1992 operation by former Cuban Air Force pilot Orestes Lorenzo to rescue his wife and their two young sons who remained in Cuba following his defection to the United States in 1991. The operation involved Lorenzo flying a light twin-engine Cessna 310 back to Cuba, landing at a predetermined time and location only long enough to pick up his family before again taking off and returning to the United States. According to press coverage, Arriaga arranged for the purchase of the plane used by Lorenzo through her employer at the time, the Valladares Foundation, and participated in organizing the clandestine communication by way of human rights activists from Mexico who acted as couriers to deliver instructions to Lorenzo's family in Havana to prepare for the rescue.

== Becket Fund ==
In 1995, Arriaga joined the Becket Fund for Religious Liberty, a public interest law firm specializing in First Amendment litigation. She would go on to serve as the firm's executive director, a position she held for seven years from 2010 to 2017. During her tenure at the Becket Fund, the firm participated in the successful litigation of several notable First Amendment legal cases at the U.S. Supreme Court, including Hosanna-Tabor v. EEOC (2012), Burwell v. Hobby Lobby (2014), and Zubik v. Burwell (2016), the latter of which came to be popularly associated with an order of Catholic nuns called the Little Sisters of the Poor, one of the consolidated petitioners represented by Becket in the case.

In both Hobby Lobby and Zubik, the firm collaborated with noted appellate litigator Paul Clement, then a long-time Georgetown law professor and former U.S. solicitor general. Becket represented Hobby Lobby and the Little Sisters of the Poor and submitted written briefs to the court, while Clement presented oral argument before the sitting justices.

== U.S. Commission on International Religious Freedom ==
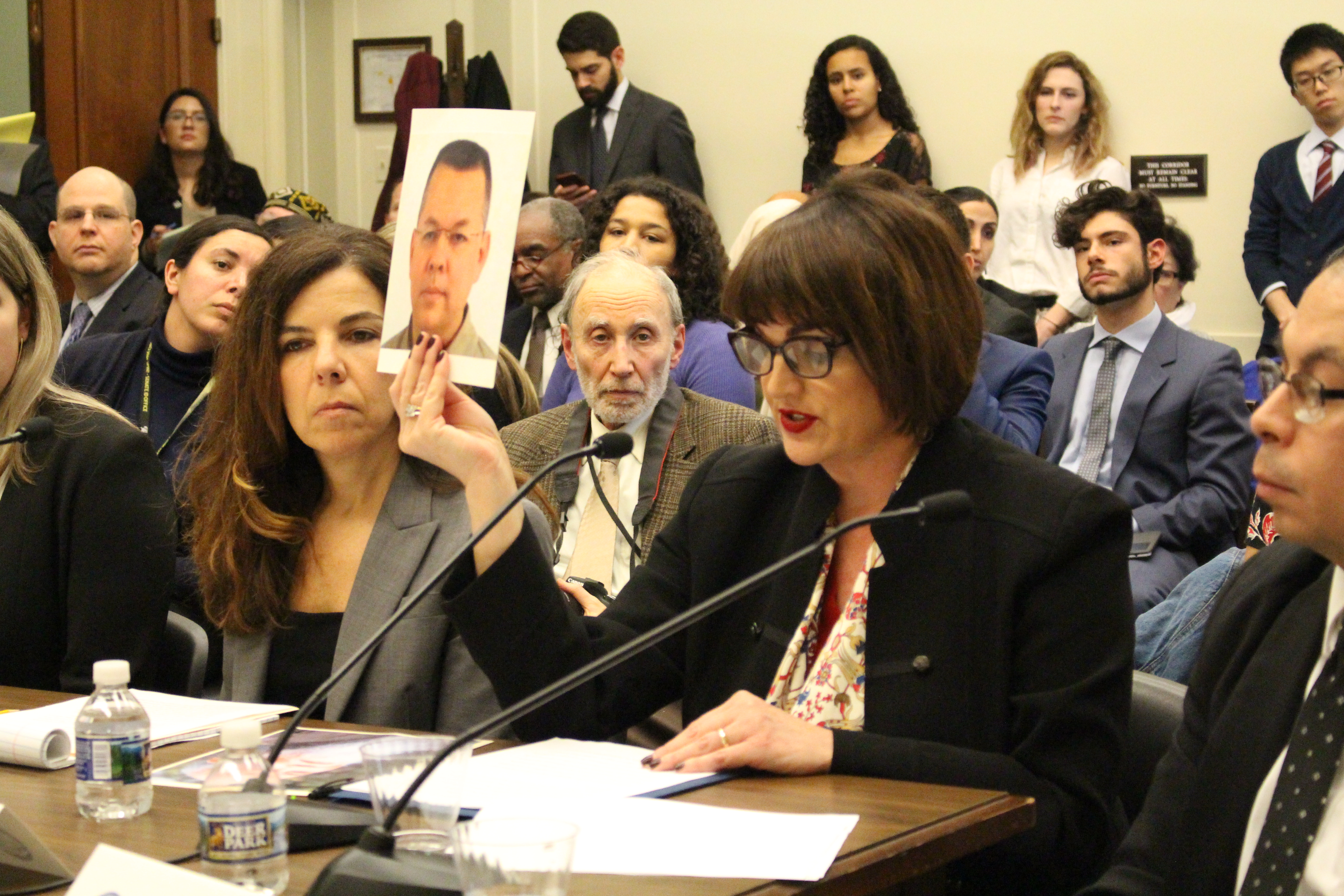
Arriaga testifies on the imprisonment of American pastor Andrew Brunson by the government of Turkey before the Tom Lantos Human Rights Commission, a body of the United States House of Representatives.

On May 18, 2016, Speaker Ryan announced his appointment of Arriaga to the U.S. Commission on International Religious Freedom (USCIRF). In 2017, her fellow commissioners elected her as vice chair of the commission, a position to which she was re-elected the following year.

Her tenure at USCIRF included a trip to Turkey, where she visited the imprisoned American pastor Andrew Brunson, who had been arrested in the purges following the 2016 coup attempt. Arriaga advocated for his release in Turkey, before a U.S. congressional human rights commission and through a Wall Street Journal opinion piece in July 2018. The following month, the U.S. Treasury Department Office of Foreign Assets Control announced sanctions against two Turkish officials for their role in Brunson's arrest. One week later, President Donald Trump announced tariffs against imports from Turkey. The Turkish government found Brunson guilty before releasing him to the U.S in October 2018.

In 2017, Arriaga was recognized by the Newseum with the Free Expression Award. Other recipients that year included civil rights activist and U.S. Congressman John Lewis and Apple CEO Tim Cook. In Cook's acceptance speech, he discussed the challenges with content moderation faced by Apple, issues of free expression in the tech sector which would confront Arriaga three years later in the newly formed Oversight Board.

On November 15, 2019, Arriaga resigned from USCIRF in protest of congressional legislation that she characterized as undermining the independence of the body and mandating bureaucratic measures that would be hurdles and distractions from the organization's mission. After notifying Speaker Nancy Pelosi of her resignation, she publicly explained her objections to the bill in a Wall Street Journal article.

== Oversight Board and Meta Platforms ==
In 2020, Arriaga was announced as one of the inaugural trustees of the Oversight Board, a role responsible for governance and budgeting procedures to maintain the board's independence from Meta.

Beginning in 2018, Meta CEO Mark Zuckerberg sought to implement a concept that would move content moderation decisions outside of the Meta corporate structure and into an independent board functioning similar to the American judiciary. This became the Oversight Board, composed of an initial 20 member voting panel who would make binding decisions regarding content moderation on the Facebook, Instagram, and Threads platforms. The board is funded by Meta, with governance by a smaller group of trustees appointed to ensure the independence of both the budgetary process and the voting members.

== Personal life ==
Through her diplomatic experience and Cuban American family upbringing, Arriaga is a native Spanish speaker. She is married to Matthew Bucholz, a former business executive and military officer who retired from the U.S. Marine Corps in the grade of lieutenant colonel. They have three adult children.

Since 2019, she has also been the CEO of Intrinsic, a public relations consulting firm.
