= OAS Special Rapporteur for Freedom of Expression =

The office of the Special Rapporteur on Freedom of Expression of the Organization of American States (OAS) was established by the Inter-American Commission on Human Rights (IACHR) in 1997 to monitor OAS member states' compliance with the American Convention on Human Rights in the area of freedom of expression.

The office analyses complaints of free expression violations received by the IACHR and advises the commission on cases, including requests for "precautionary measures" from OAS member states to protect journalists and others who face threats or the risk of irreparable harm.

In cases involving a serious violation of freedom of expression, the Special Rapporteur issues press releases about the information it has received, expresses its concern to the authorities, and makes recommendations for re-instating this right. In other cases, the special rapporteur directly contacts government authorities to obtain further information and/or to request that the government take measures to rectify the harm that has been inflicted.

The special rapporteur also makes recommendations to OAS member states to reform laws and regulations that violate free expression rights guaranteed under the convention.

The special rapporteur participates in education, training and other activities to promote the right to freedom of expression and support local journalists and human rights defenders, and conducts fact-finding missions to investigate reports of abuses in OAS member states.

Each year, the rapporteur issues an annual report detailing the state of press freedom and freedom of expression in each country in the Americas.

The OAS Rapporteur is one of the four International Mechanisms for Promoting Freedom of Expression, the others being the UN Special Rapporteur on Freedom of Opinion and Expression, the African Commission on Human and Peoples' Rights Special Rapporteur on Freedom of Expression and the OSCE Representative on Freedom of the Media. Each year, they issue a joint declaration calling attention to worldwide free expression concerns.

== Special rapporteurs ==
- Dr. Santiago A. Canton (Argentina): 1998–2002
- Dr. Eduardo Bertoni (Argentina): 2002–2006
- Dr. Ignacio Álvarez (Venezuela): 2006–2008
- Dr. Catalina Botero (Colombia): 2008–2014
- Dr. Edison Lanza (Uruguay): 2014–2020
- Dr. Pedro Vaca Villarreal (Colombia): 2020–present

== See also ==
- Special rapporteur
