= Andrew Brunson =

American pastor (born 1968)

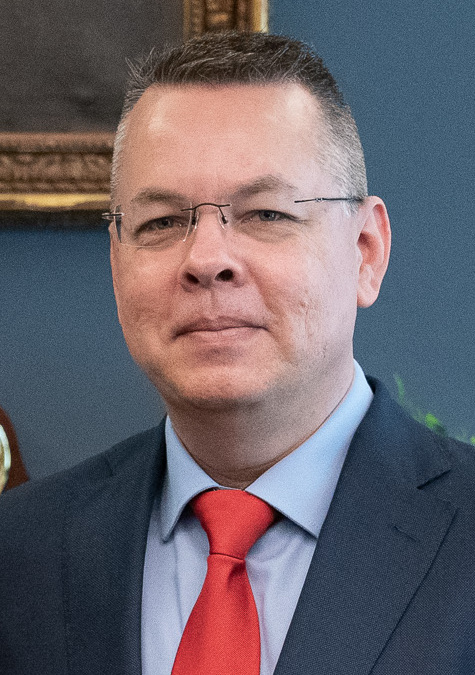
- Brunson in October 2019

Personal life
- Born: Andrew Craig Brunson; January 3, 1968 (age 58) Black Mountain, North Carolina, U.S.
- Spouse: Norine Brunson
- Children: 3
- Education: Wheaton College (bachelors, 1988); Trinity Evangelical Divinity School (M.A., 1991); Erskine Theological Seminary M.Div.; University of Aberdeen (PhD, 2001)
- Website: epc.org/news/freepastorandrew/

Religious life
- Religion: Protestant
- Denomination: Evangelical Presbyterian Church
- Church: Founder: İzmir Resurrection Church; Home church: Christ Community Church in Montreat, N.C.

Senior posting
- Based in: Former: İzmir, Turkey
- Post: Pastor

Andrew Craig Brunson (born January 3, 1968) is an American pastor. Before becoming a lecturer in the Evangelical Presbyterian Church, he was the evangelical pastor of a Protestant church with a congregation of 24 people in İzmir, Turkey.

Brunson was arrested in Turkey, where he has lived since the mid-1990s, in 2016 on allegations of spying and links to the Gülen movement and the PKK during the purges following the coup attempt against 65th cabinet of Turkey. In 2019, Brunson published a memoir.

On September 28, 2017, Tayyip Erdoğan made an unsuccessful offer to swap Brunson for Islamic preacher Fethullah Gülen. On August 1, 2018, the United States Department of the Treasury sanctioned two senior Turkish government officials, Justice Minister Abdulhamit Gül and Interior Minister Süleyman Soylu, for their role in Brunson's arrest. On August 9, 2018, US President Donald Trump announced increased tariffs on Turkish products. Erdoğan also raised tariffs on US products in retaliation.

On October 12, 2018, Brunson was found guilty of aiding terrorism by the Turkish authorities and sentenced to prison. He was released from Turkish custody and immediately returned to the United States.

== Arrest ==
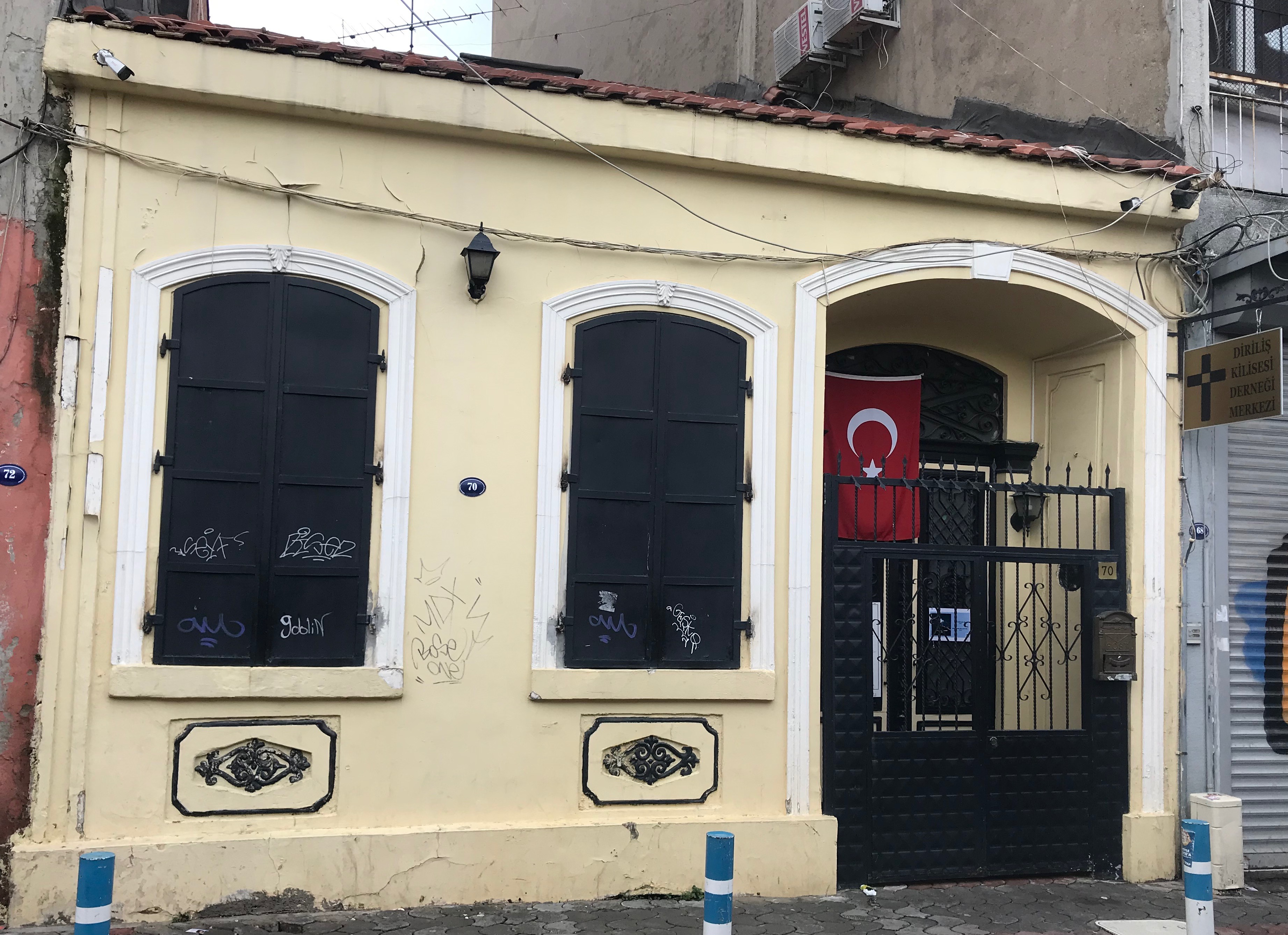
İzmir Resurrection Church

Andrew Brunson is originally from Black Mountain, North Carolina. He is married and has three children. Brunson lived in Turkey for 23 years where he served as pastor of the İzmir Resurrection Church in İzmir. Brunson, who was applying for Turkish permanent residency, was imprisoned on October 7, 2016, as part of the purges that followed the failed 2016 coup attempt. His wife, Norine, was initially arrested alongside him, but was released after 13 days. For a time Brunson was held with 21 others in a cell that was made for eight prisoners. He reportedly lost over 50 pounds (20 kg) while he was in prison.

In his memoir account of his imprisonment, Brunson describes the U.S. government efforts to secure his release at a time when he could not obtain legal representation in Turkey due to government repression during the purges. On October 5, 2017, Kristina Arriaga and Sandra Jolley of the United States Commission on International Religious Freedom (USCIRF) visited Brunson in prison to discuss his case and offer support. Brunson described the encounter as "much needed reassurance" after Arriaga emphasized his innocence and consoled him as he wept.

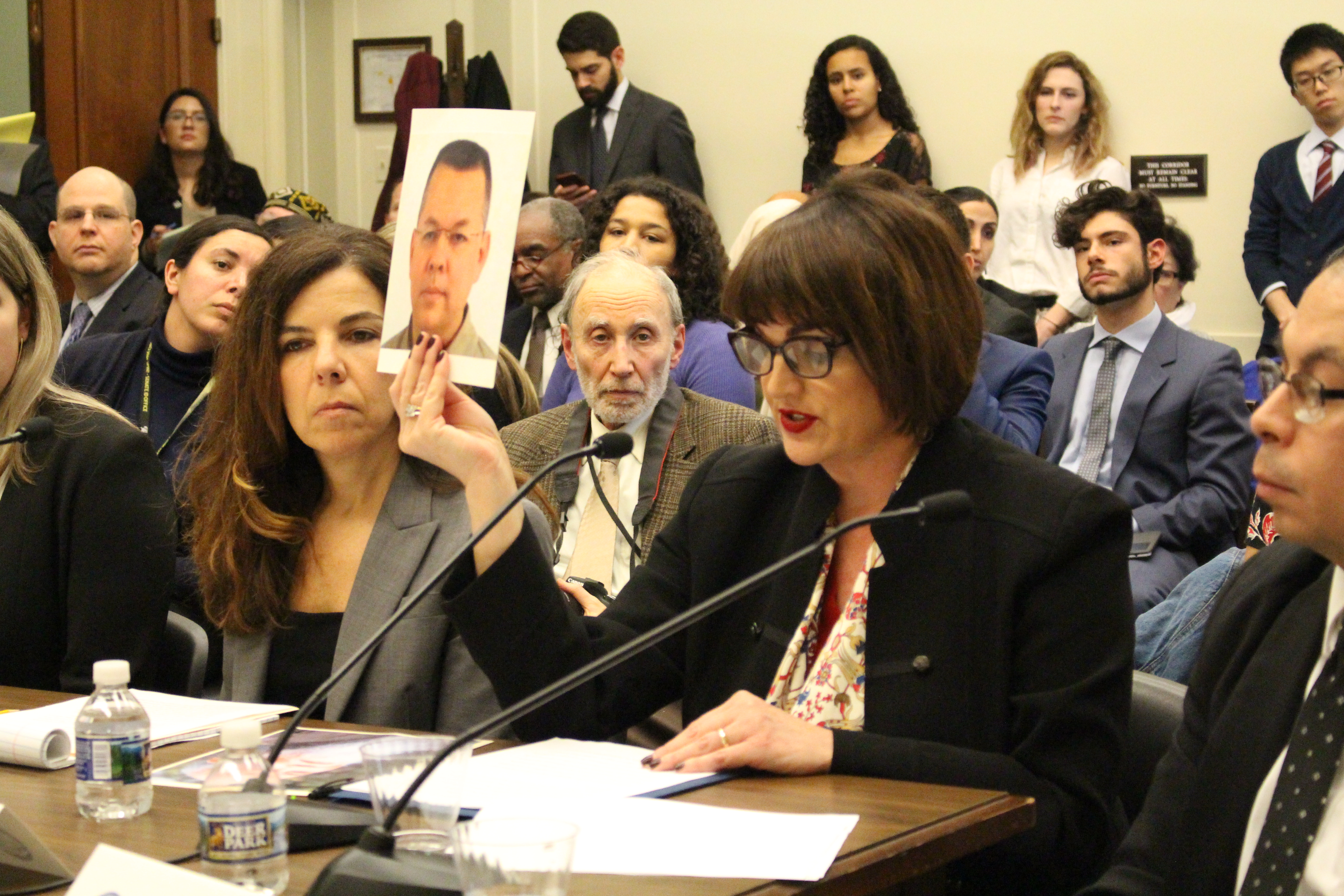
Kristina Arriaga testifies before Congress to advocate for the release of Brunson in February 2018

As part of the ongoing campaign to free Brunson, Arriaga would go on to testify on Brunson's behalf before the Tom Lantos Human Rights Commission of the United States Congress on February 15, 2018. Her op-ed in The Wall Street Journal titled "The Pastor Caught in Turkey’s Chaos" further raised the profile of Brunson's plight.

Following this sustained advocacy and in the midst of increasing pressure from the Trump administration, the Turkish government moved Brunson to house arrest on July 25, 2018.

== Indictment ==
The Turkish government primarily claimed that Brunson was a member of the Gülen movement, but also claimed that he worked with the banned Kurdistan Workers' Party (PKK), and claimed that he was involved with American espionage, among other things. In addition, they claimed that he was interested in overthrowing the Turkish government and that he supposedly helped plan the coup, which he denied.

Turkish Foreign Minister Mevlut Cavusoglu claimed that the case was triggered by a complaint from a translator. The Turkish government claimed that they didn't know about the case until the consulate addressed it.

The trial caused a major public diplomatic row between the United States and Turkey. The United States stood firm in its argument that the trial was unacceptable because the government "has not seen credible evidence Mr. Brunson is guilty of a crime and are convinced that he is innocent"., as the State Department said in a statement. The Trump administration insisted that the Turkish government free Brunson entirely. Turkey objected to this on the basis of this being an interference with the country's sovereignty.

Erdogan objected to the idea of interfering with the courts, arguing that he shouldn't on the basis that they are independent.

=== Hearings ===
In May 2018, a hearing for his case occurred in Aliaga that lasted eleven hours. The judge dismissed all of Brunson's defense witnesses without listening to any of their testimony.

The prosecution used secret witnesses who "testified through video monitors that distorted their faces and voices in order to conceal their identities".

Sandra Jolley, vice chair of the United States Commission on International Religious Freedom attended the case, and released the following statement:

"We leave the courthouse with serious concerns. Today's eleven hours of proceedings were dominated by wild conspiracies, tortured logic, and secret witnesses, but no real evidence to speak of. Upon these rests a man's life" She described the judge's decision not to allow any of the witnesses called by Brunson's defense to testify on his behalf as "simply unconscionable". The judge would relent in a later hearing. Hearings were held on July 13, 2018.

At his final hearing on October 12, 2018, several prosecution witnesses retracted their earlier statements which led to his release that same day.

== Trial ==
Brunson was held for over a year without charges. Turkish prosecutors charged Brunson with involvement in the failed July 2016 coup attempt. Turkish media reported that Brunson had been accused of espionage and attempting to overthrow the government. He was originally charged with having links to Gülen movement and PKK (both are considered terrorist organizations by the Turkish state). The New York Times reported that two secret witnesses accused Brunson of "hosting Kurdish refugees in a guesthouse and holding services and gatherings sympathetic to the PKK". Brunson denied helping the coup, and denied he had intentionally had contact with either group blamed for the coup. He was one of 20 American citizens who were prosecuted in connection with the post-coup purges.

=== Fethullah Gülen network ("FETÖ")-related ===
Court documents said that a photo of maqluba, a popular Levantine rice dish, was found on Brunson's phone. The court documents described maqluba as a "Gulenist delicacy". The Asheville Citizen-Times says that it mentions that Brunson's daughter, who was raised in Turkey, had sent the offending video of the maqluba to his iPhone, which was found by the Turkish government. The Turkish government alleges that it is eaten in Gülenist safe houses.

According to Slate, "The case against Brunson is reportedly based on the testimony of an undisclosed witness, though reports vary as to what exactly the witness alleges. In one version, Brunson attended a Gülenist event. In another, he spoke positively once about relations between Christians and the movement." Brunson was charged with "membership in an armed terrorist organization", "gathering state secrets for espionage, attempting to overthrow the Turkish parliament and government, and to change the constitutional order".

Brunson contacted the chair of Amnesty International in Turkey, Taner Kilic, to ask about his residency permit nine times. Kilic would later be indicted as a member of the alleged Gülenist organization on the grounds that he allegedly had a particular secure messaging app on his phone, which he denies, and opening a bank account. Because of this, Brunson's prior contact with the lawyer was deemed retroactively terrorist in nature.

A secret witness claimed to have overheard a supposed "Israeli missionary" say that Brunson attended an alleged March 2013 event at an Istanbul convention center where the attendees supposedly plotted the Gezi Park protests. It was claimed that Brunson possessed a list containing information for "'gas station workers in Turkey's southeast,' 'railway employees,' or 'soldiers to get in contact with'" in relation to this supposed planning. Another secret witness involved claimed that they could not understand what the information meant, possibly that certain locations were supposedly meant to be "logistics centers".

=== PKK-related ===
The prosecution claimed that Brunson was a collaborator with armed Kurdish groups, that he went to YPG territory in Syria (specifically Kobani and Turkey's Suruç district), and that he wanted to Christianize Kurdistan and have it be a Christian state.

Brunson claimed that he evangelized Syrian refugees without regard to their ethnic identity, and strongly denied the idea that he had any connection with PKK members.

The prosecution claimed that there was GPS data that placed him near the Syrian border. According to a July 2018 article in World by Aykan Erdemir and Merve Tahiroglu, there was a photograph that features both Brunson and a man wearing a yellow, red, and green scarf, which is presented as proof of his involvement with Kurdish nationalist terrorism.

It is claimed by the prosecution that Brunson published Kurdish Bibles. It is also claimed that he was part of an operation to help Kurdish families write asylum letters to Canada that strongly criticized the AKP and MHP.

=== US-related ===
The prosecution claimed that Brunson helped the CIA with the attempted coup.

In relation to claims about Christianity, the indictment also made the claim that there was a so-called "Mormon Gang" within American intelligence.

It was alleged by one of the witnesses that Brunson's church was supposedly a waypoint for co-ordinates between the CIA and YPG due to alleged support for the PKK.

Brunson was accused of attending an event in a Turkish hotel where the American anthem was allegedly playing and several Turkish college students put their right hand on their heart and made vows, which the prosecution further alleges was some kind of "brainwashing" of these alleged students.

=== Christianity-related ===
The indictment also made many other broad claims about Christianity and the United States government that the Asheville Citizen-Times described as conspiracy theories.

According to the Asheville Citizen-Times, the indictment contained a "lengthy discourse on the alleged influence of Mormons in Turkey" (Brunson is not Mormon). According to World, the secret witness was specifically concerned with English teachers at the nation's "military high schools". The secret witness also made claims about them missing fingers. Brunson is not Mormon, but is alleged to have LDS contacts, which they further allege is suspicious.

According to the Asheville Citizen-Times, it also contained an accusation that every church in the United States is connected to some organization with the acronym "CAMA", that "holds sway over" every one of them. The indictment also made the claim that every evangelical missionary and Mormon missionary who wants to leave the United States must have permission from this organization, indicating that they allege that it influences both. (However, Protestants and Mormons have many theological disagreements.) This group is unfamiliar to Christian officials within the ACLJ, who view it as an "unfounded" theory.

It was also alleged by the prosecution that there are websites on the internet that describe Turkish president Erdogan as the Antichrist, and the indictment almost suggests it as a motive for Brunson, a Christian, to help the coup plotters. The Citizen-Times argued that theory is most likely overshadowed by theories regarding more popular leaders, wildly obscure, and not likely to be widely believed in.

=== Further claims by Turkish media ===
A December 14, 2016, a Sabah daily news story, said to be based on an informant, claimed that Brunson, while dispensing aid among Syrian refugees, tried to divide Turkey with sermons praising Gülenism and by speaking in support of the banned Kurdistan Workers' Party (PKK). The pro-Erdogan administration newspaper Takvim alleges that Brunson was a "high-level member of the Gülen movement" and an American spy, positioned to become CIA chief in Turkey had the 2016 coup attempt succeeded. Takvim's editor-in-chief, Ergun Diler, alleged that Brunson fended off an assassination attempt thanks to his intelligence agency training, further claiming that Brunson was influential all over the region. Diler speculated that the CIA would assassinate Brunson in prison if it thought he would not be deported back to the U.S.

== Reactions ==
In April 2018, a bipartisan group of U.S. senators led by North Carolina senator Thom Tillis sent a letter to Erdoğan stating they were "deeply disturbed that the Turkish government has gone beyond legitimate action against the coup plotters to undermine Turkey's own rule of law and democratic traditions."

Brunson has said, "I am not a member of an Islamic movement. I have never seen any member of FETÖ [the Gülen movement] in my life." In a March 2017 letter to U.S. President Donald Trump through an attorney with the American Center for Law and Justice, Brunson said, "Let the Turkish government know that you will not cooperate with them in any way until they release me."

According to a February 2017 letter to the president of Turkey signed by 78 members of the U.S. Congress, "There appears to be no evidence to substantiate the charges against him for membership in an armed terrorist organization."

A petition for the release of Brunson was launched on the White House's "WE the PEOPLE" citizen petitions website in February 2017, but was later closed without garnering enough signatures. The American Center for Law and Justice launched similar petitions on its main website and the website of its Be Heard Project.

The Evangelical Presbyterian Church of America called for a prayer and fasting October 7–8, 2017 for Brunson's release.

In October 2017, Ihsan Ozbek, chairman of the Association of Protestant Churches in Turkey, told The New York Times, "Andrew was a normal American Christian; he is not a spy. I know him".

=== International relations ===
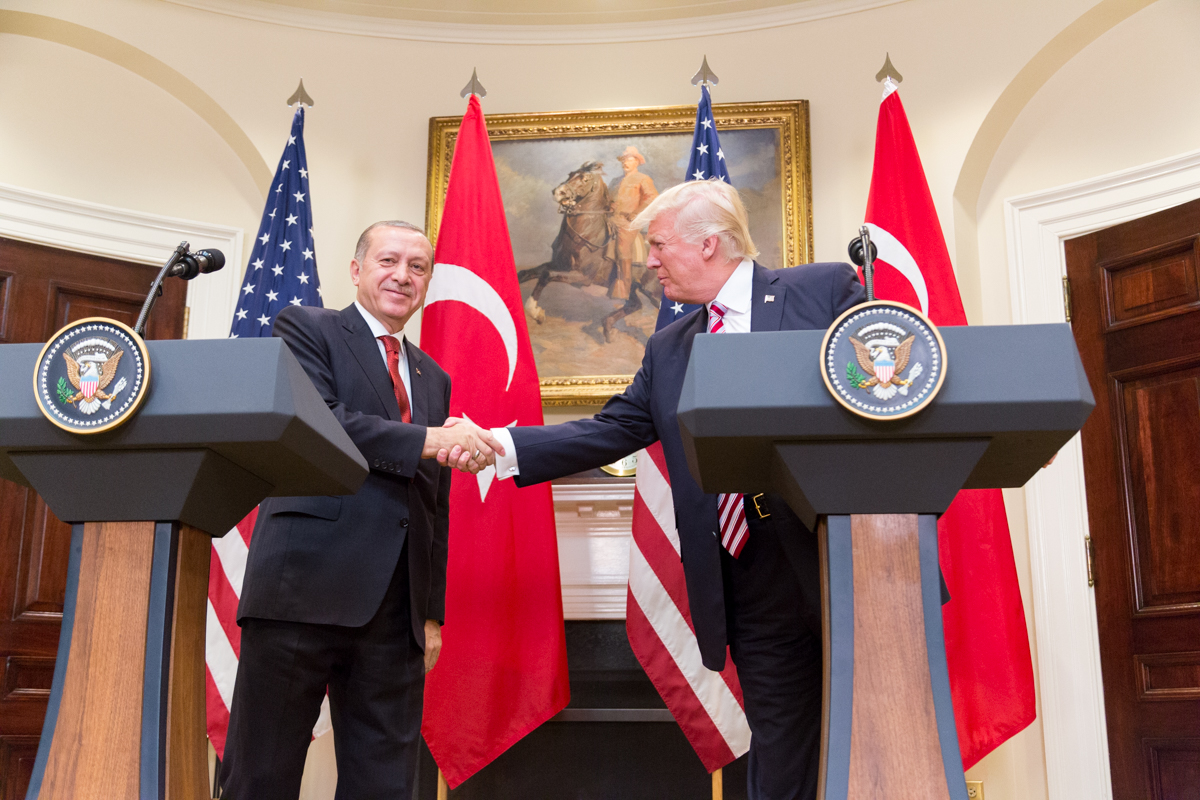
President Trump and Turkish President Erdoğan give a joint statement at the White House in May 2017

Trump brought this issue up with Erdogan at a meeting on May 13, 2017. On September 28, 2017, Erdoğan said the United States should exchange Pennsylvania-based Islamic preacher Fethullah Gülen with Pastor Andrew Brunson, saying "You have a pastor too. Give him to us. ... Then we will try [Brunson] and give him to you." The federal judiciary alone determines extradition cases in the U.S. An August 2017 decree gave Erdogan authority to approve the exchange of detained or convicted foreigners with people held in other countries. Asked about the suggested swap on September 28, 2017, U.S. State Department spokeswoman Heather Nauert said: "I can't imagine that we would go down that road. ... We have received extradition requests for [Gülen]." Anonymous U.S. officials have said to reporters that the Turkish government has not yet provided sufficient evidence for the U.S. Justice Department to charge Gülen.

On October 11, 2017, departing U.S. Ambassador to Turkey John R. Bass said Brunson "appears to be being held simply because he's an American citizen who as a man of faith was in contact with a range of people in this country who he was trying to help, in keeping with his faith".

In June 2018, a bipartisan bill changing the NDAA to block the transfer of F-35 fighter jets to Turkey was authored by senators Thom Tillis (R-NC) and Jeanne Shaheen (D-NH) and was passed through Congress. Alongside a third senator, Senator James Lankford (R-OK), special legislation was created with the intent of preventing Turkey from "working to degrade NATO interoperability, exposing NATO assets to hostile actors, degrading the security of NATO member countries, seeking to import weapons from a foreign country under sanction by the U.S., and wrongfully or unlawfully detaining any American citizens." The senators expressed concerns about Turkey's growing ties to Russia and their concerns about the Brunson case.

On July 5, 2018, in anticipation of Pastor Brunson's third day of trial, 98 Members of the European Parliament, from all political groups and 21 countries, sent an open letter to remind President Erdoğan of "the European and International commitments of the Republic of Turkey in regard to freedom of religion, to the prohibition of arbitrary detention, and to the right to a fair trial." They especially protest "against the fact that Pastor Brunson had to wait almost a year and half before being indicted" and against "the fact that the indictment associates 'Christianization' with terrorism, considering the Christian faith as endangering Turkey's unity, while Christianity has been peacefully present in this land long before the current Republic of Turkey."

On July 18, 2018, President Trump tweeted President Erdogan calling for Brunson's release. Trump called the Turkish government's refusal to release Brunson a "total disgrace", described him as being "held hostage" and defended Brunson against the government's accusations. On the same day, President Trump released a tweet, stating that the United States would impose sanctions on Turkey due to Brunson's detention.

According to The Independent, Turkey moving Brunson to house arrest on July 25 was seen as "too little, too late" by American authorities and a phone call between the two countries on July 26 was described as "not going well". It associates the July 25 swap with the release of a Turkish citizen by Israel on July 15, as it is claimed that there was an offer for a swap between the two.

On August 1, 2018, the United States Department of Treasury imposed sanctions on two top Turkish government officials who were involved in the detention of Brunson, Turkish Justice Minister Abdulhamit Gül and Interior Minister Suleyman Soylu. Daniel Glaser, the former Treasury official under President Barack Obama, said: "It's certainly the first time I can think of" the U.S. sanctioning a NATO ally. "I certainly regard it as a human rights violation to unlawfully detain somebody, so I think it falls within the scope of the Global Magnitsky Act."

On August 9, 2018, Trump raised tariffs on Turkish aluminum and steel to 20 and 50 percent, respectively. Erdogan reacted on August 14 by placing tariffs of 120 and 140 percent on U.S. cars and alcohol. Commentators such as Vox's Jen Kirby have pointed to the pivotal role Brunson's case plays in it.

Turkish President Erdogan described American actions in the case as choosing a pastor above the strategic relationship between Ankara and Washington, and that Washington has "turned their back on" Ankara, stating that it "annoyed" and "upset" them.

According to The Washington Post, there was supposedly a deal to free Brunson if the U.S. would ask Israel to free a Turkish citizen accused of being part of Hamas, which fell through. According to a White House official, "Turkey missed a real opportunity. Pastor Brunson is not a bargaining chip." Senior Turkish officials deny the existence of such a deal. A report from The Economist said diplomatic talks involving Brunson on one side and Halkbank's Atilla on the other came close to success but then broke down over Turkish interest in stopping further Halkbank investigations. Brunson was moved to house arrest in Turkey from prison there following these negotiations.

== U.S. repatriation ==
=== Release ===
On Friday, October 12, 2018 Brunson was released and flown to the United States, where he met in the Oval Office with President Trump the next day.

=== Prison memoir ===
- Andrew Brunson with Craig Borlase (2019). God's Hostage: A True Story of Persecution, Imprisonment, and Perseverance. Baker Books. ISBN 9781493421619.

=== Rumor of would-be assassination ===
In 2020, a Turkish ex secret service agent imprisoned in Argentina, Serkan Kurtulus, said to reporters that in 2016, when Brunson was in Turkey, individuals with ties to the Turkish government had requested for Kurtulus to recruit someone to assassinate Brunson with the intention of making the assassination appear the work of individuals within exiled Turkish preacher Fethullah Gülen's Hizmet network, Kurtulus's saying that the officials had asked him "to find a young person, a religious person who would sacrifice himself for the nation". A spokesperson for the Turkish Embassy in Washington, D.C., denied Kurtulus's claim.

== See also ==
- 2016–present purges in Turkey
- Human rights in Turkey
- Hostage diplomacy
