= Evelyn Aswad =

Facebook Oversight Board member

Evelyn Mary Aswad is an American legal scholar and the Herman G. Kaiser Chair in International Law at the University of Oklahoma College of Law, and was previously an official in the United States Department of State. As of 2021, she serves as a member of Facebook's independent Oversight Board.

Aswad received a B.S.F.S. from Georgetown University's Walsh School of Foreign Service in 1992, and in the summer of 1993 received a grant from the Ford Foundation to study issues relating to the use of torture. She received her J.D. from the Georgetown University Law Center in 1995. That same year, Aswad published a noted law review article, Torture By Means of Rape, "arguing that rape committed by government officials for political purposes should be recognized as torture under international law". Aswad then worked as an attorney for the United States Department of State, where she became director of the Office of Human Rights and Refugees, serving in that position until 2013, when she joined the University of Oklahoma College of Law as a professor of international law holding the school's Herman G. Kaiser Chair in International Law, and as director of its Center for International Business and Human Rights.

Aswad "specializes in the application of international human rights standards to content moderation issues", and her scholarship "has focused on issues like freedom of expression online, how foreign and domestic laws affect human rights standards, mass atrocities, global corporate responsibility standards and how the United States engages the world on human rights". She has proposed in several articles "that social media companies use universal human rights protections in their content moderation decisions". In May 2020, she was selected to serve as one of the 20 founding members of Facebook's Oversight Board, and in July 2020, Aswad was tapped to lead "comparative research on First Amendment and international human rights law's protection for speech online", funded by a grant to the University of Oklahoma College of Law and other institutions from the John S. and James L. Knight Foundation.

In July 2023, following a recommendation from the oversight board to deplatform Cambodian head of state Hun Sen, the government of Cambodia listed Aswad as one of 22 people connected with Meta who were banned from entering the country.
