= Afia Asantewaa Asare-Kyei =

Ghanaian lawyer

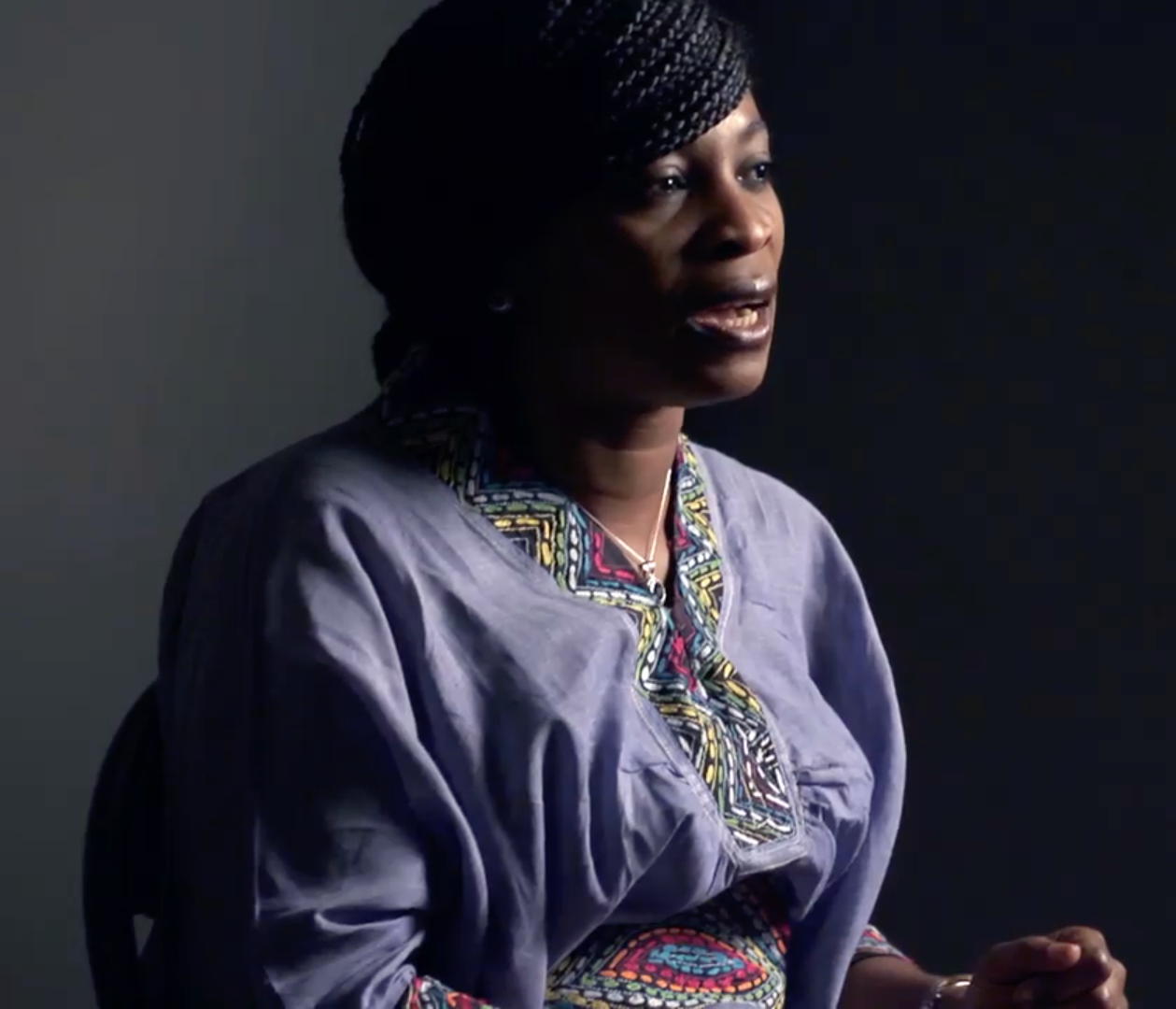
Afia Asare-Kyei in 2014

Afia Asantewaa Asare-Kyei is a human rights lawyer and member of Meta's Oversight Board. She works as program manager for the Open Society Initiative for West Africa (OSIWA). Her areas of expertise include human rights, women's rights, criminal justice, access to information and media freedom issues in Africa. She is a citizen of both Ghana and South Africa.

She studied law at the Centre for Human Rights at Pretoria University in South Africa. Before joining OSIWA, she previously worked for Save the Children and USAID. In March 2020, she was one of the three Africans appointed to the Facebook Oversight Board. In July 2023, following a recommendation from the oversight board to deplatform Cambodian head of state Hun Sen, the government of Cambodia listed Asare-Kyei as one of 22 people connected with Meta who were banned from entering the country.
