= András Sajó =

Hungarian judge

Judge of the European Court of Human Rights in respect of Hungary
- In office 1 February 2008 – 23 April 2017
- Preceded by: András Baka
- Succeeded by: Péter Paczolay

Personal details
- Born: 25 March 1949 (age 77) Budapest, Hungary

András Sajó (born 25 March 1949) is a Hungarian legal academic and former European Court of Human Rights judge.

Sajó was born in Budapest. He was the founding Dean of the Legal Studies department at the Central European University in Budapest. Later he chaired the Comparative Constitutional Law LL.M. program.

Between 2001 and 2007, he served on the board of directors of the Open Society Justice Initiative of New York.

Between February, 2008 and April, 2017 he served as a Judge of the European Court of Human Rights in respect of Hungary. He was the President of the First Section of the Court as well as the President of the Fourth Section. As a judge, he was cited in an independent NGO report which shows that he seated in three cases where the Open Society Justice Initiative was involved as a third party (Centro Europa 7 S.r.l. and Di Stefano v. Italy, Pauliukienė and Pauliukas v. Lithuania and Ahmet Yldirim v. Turkey).

After completing the term at the Court, Sajó returned to the CEU, where he currently is a university professor. On 6 May 2020, Facebook appointed him to its content oversight board.
