= Catalina Botero Marino =

Colombian attorney (born 1965)

Dr. Catalina Botero
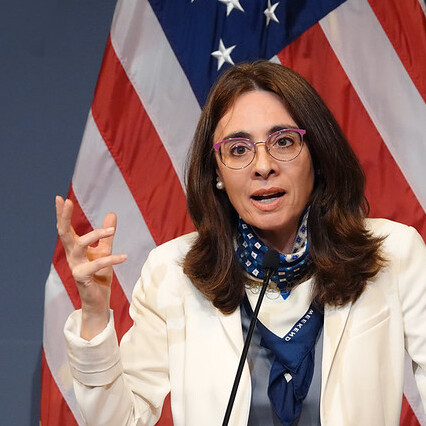
- Catalina Botero in 2024
- Born: 7 September 1965 (age 61); Bogotá, Colombia
- Citizenship: Colombian
- Occupations: Human rights defender; Lawyer; Dean

Academic background
- Education: Law professional
- Alma mater: University of Los Andes, Colombia; Complutense University of Madrid

Catalina Botero Marino (born 7 September 1965 in Bogotá) is a Colombian attorney who served as the Special Rapporteur for Freedom of Expression for the Inter-American Commission on Human Rights (IACHR) from 2008 to 2014. From 2016 to 2020, she was the Dean of the Law School of the University of Los Andes (Colombia). Since 2020 she is one of four co-chairs of Facebook's Oversight Board, a body that adjudicates Facebook's content moderation decisions.

== Biography ==
=== Early life and education ===
Botero is the daughter of an architect/designer and an ecologist. She attended the Juan Ramón Jiménez secondary school in Bogotá and received her law degree in 1988 from the University of the Andes.

While a student, Botero was a leader of the "Septima Papeleta" (Seventh Ballot) Movement, which called for the convocation of a National Constituent Assembly in Colombia in 1991.

After receiving her law degree, she went on to do postgraduate studies in Public Management and Administrative Law at the same university. She continued her postgraduate work in Madrid, where she studied human rights at the University Human Rights Institute at the Universidad Complutense (1990–91), studied constitutional rights and political science at the Center for Constitutional Studies (1992), and received a degree in advanced studies (DEA) at the Charles III University of Madrid.

== Professional life ==
Botero is a member of the external transparency panel of the Inter-American Development Bank, commissioner of the International Commission of Jurists and member of the International Bar Association's Human Rights Institute Council. She is a visiting professor at the Max Planck Institute for Comparative Public Law and International Law the (MPIL), an adjunct professor at the American University's Human Rights Academy, and an expert member of the Columbia University's Columbia Global Freedom of Expression Initiative.

She was Special Rapporteur for Freedom of Expression of the Inter-American Commission on Human Rights of the OAS and an Associate Judge of the Constitutional Court and of the Supreme Administrative Court in Colombia.

She also serves as well as an Arbitrator for the Chamber of Commerce of Bogotá.

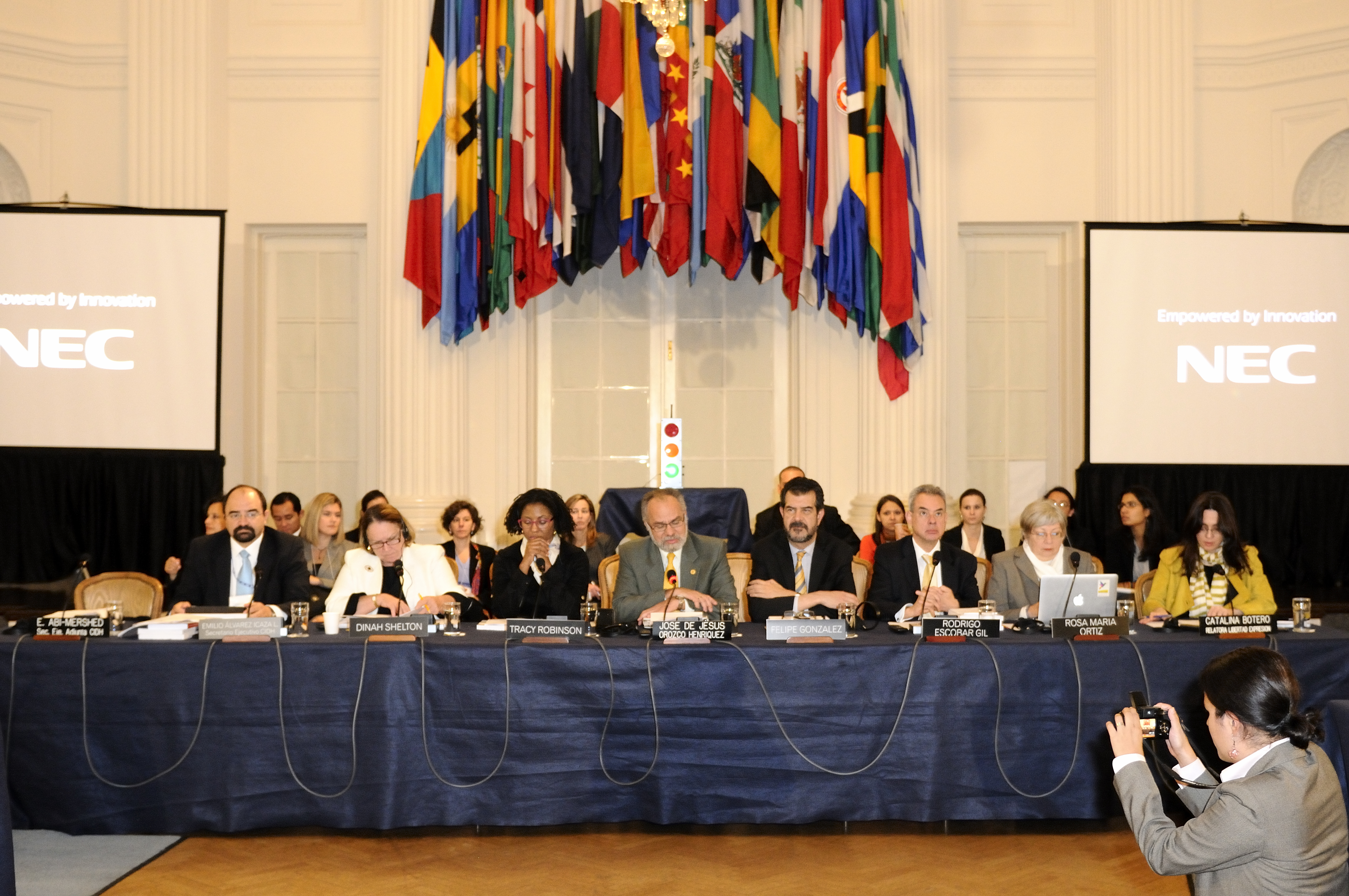
Catalina Botero participating in a hearing before civil society on the strengthening of the Inter-American Human Rights System in Washington D.C., in 2012.

=== Special Rapporteur ===
The Inter-American Commission on Human Rights (IACHR) elected Botero as Special Rapporteur for Freedom of Expression on 21 July 2007. She took up the position in July 2008.

In August 2010, Botero and Frank La Rue, the then UN Special Rapporteur on Freedom of Expression, made recommendations to the Mexican government regarding freedom of expression and access to public information. They stated that Mexico is the most dangerous country for journalists in the Americas. They also criticized the fact that impunity was widespread in Mexico, that free expression was constrained by federal and state laws, that there was lack of media plurality, and that access to public information was increasingly restricted.

In 2011, Botero wrote an article entitled "Freedom of Expression in the Americas," which observed that while Latin American military dictatorships had given way, in large part, to democratic governments, a "culture of secrecy" remained in place, as did "restrictive press laws." It stated that "the region faces a number of major challenges," including the protection of journalists, the decriminalization of speech acts, access to information, direct and indirect censorship, and pluralism and diversity in public debate.

In 2012, after Botero criticized attacks on the news media by Ecuadorian President Rafael Correa, he joined Venezuelan President Hugo Chávez in dismissing her criticism of their governments and submitting a proposal to the OAS "to review the freedom of expression office and limit its jurisdiction."

On 22 March 2013, El Comercio (Peru) reported that Botero had expressed concern over restrictions on the commission and its funding that had been proposed by Ecuador, saying that it should have "a permanent fund...that would allow the commission to completely fulfill all its responsibilities." Otherwise, she warned, the Special Rapporteur's office would have to be closed.

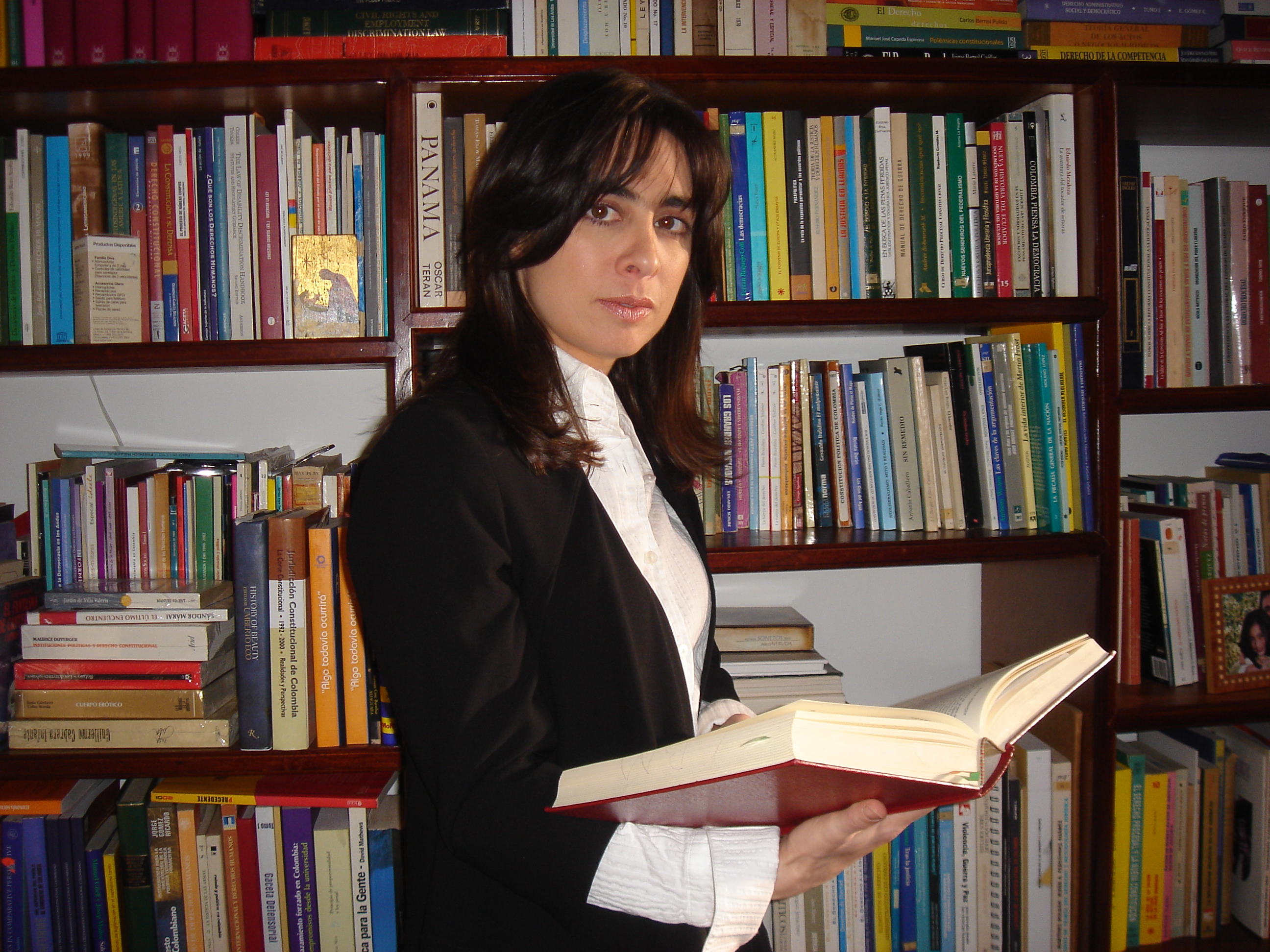
Catalina Botero (2014)

=== Other professional activities ===
In January 2008, Botero took part in a seminar on "Media and Government," arranged in Washington, D.C., by the Inter-American Dialogue. Botero is a member of such organization. In 2012, she was the keynote speaker at a Mexico City event entitled "Change Your World," sponsored by Yahoo!, at which women from around the Americas gathered to discuss and exchange experiences and ideas relating to human rights and technology.

In 2016, Botero Marino, along with a group of Colombian lawyers, the Global Freedom of Expression project at Columbia University, UNESCO, Dejusticia, and The Foundation for Press Freedom, created the Freedom of Expression Case Law online database, allowing access to information of the highest courts of 16 Latin American countries.

On 6 May 2020, Facebook (renamed worldwide in October 2021 as Meta) appointed her to its Oversight Board. Catalina is the Director of the UNESCO Chair on Freedom of Expression at the University of the Andes.

== See also ==
- Inter-American Commission on Human Rights
- Inter-American Dialogue
