= John Samples =

Writer and political theorist (born c.1950s)

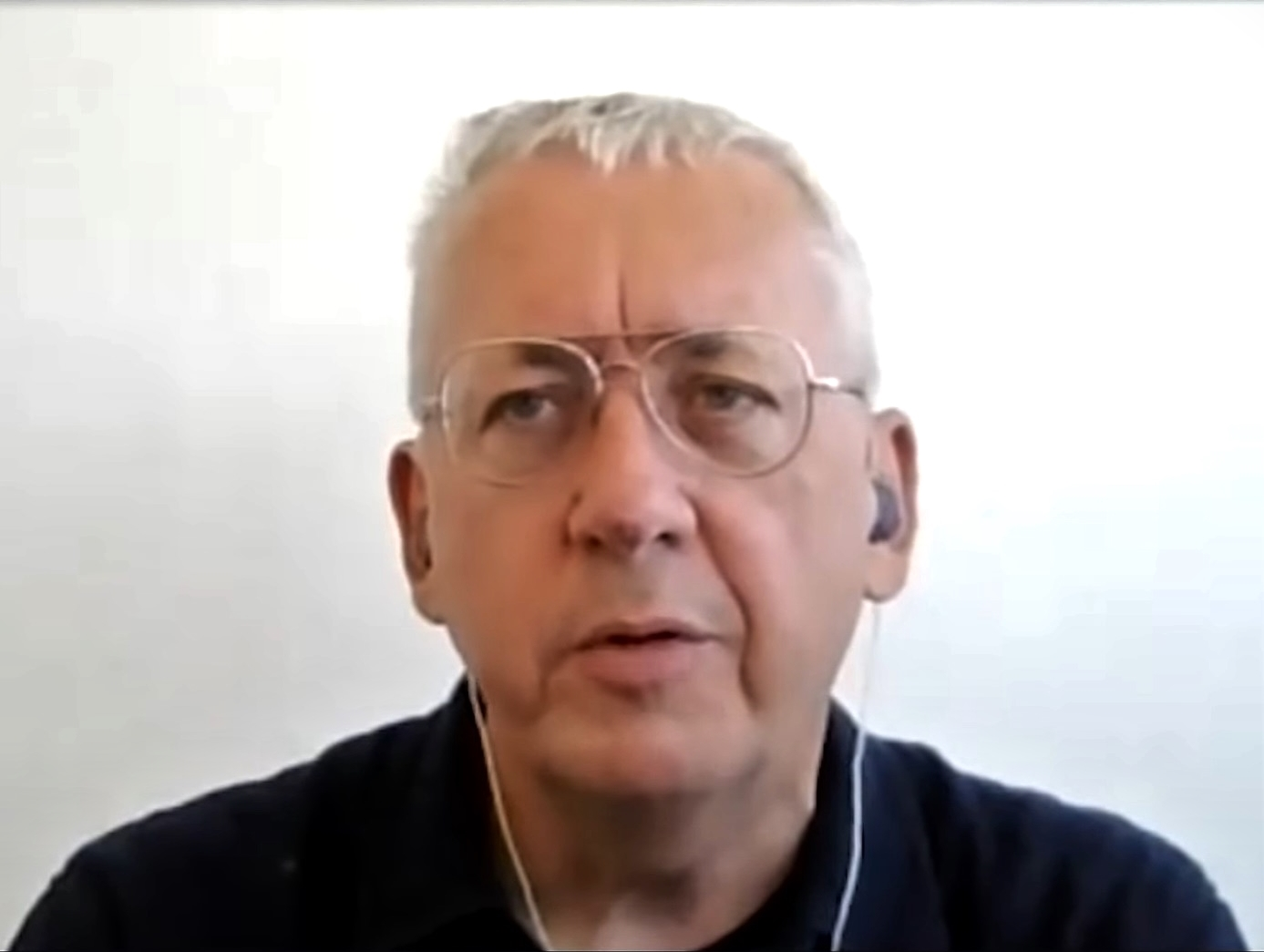
Samples on Reason TV in 2021

John Curtis Samples (born c. 1950s) is an American political theorist, author, and vice president of the Cato Institute. As of 2021, he serves as a member of Facebook's independent Oversight Board.

Samples received a B.A. in political science and government from Eastern Kentucky University in 1978, and a Ph.D. from Rutgers University in 1984. As a graduate student in political science at Rutgers in the 1970s, Samples met Michael T. Hayes, who remembered Samples as "one of the very best students I had encountered during my years there"; Samples later directed Hayes on the writing of the 2001 book The Limits of Policy Change: Incrementalism, Worldview, and the Rule of Law. After completing his Ph.D., Samples taught for various periods at institutions including Texas State University, Rutgers, Georgetown University, and Johns Hopkins University, while also serving in other professional capacities. He was Vice President for Programs and Program Officer of the Twentieth Century Fund from 1987 to 1992, and then director of the Georgetown University Press until 2000. In that year, he joined the Cato Institute, a "U.S. libertarian think tank" as director of its Center for Representative Government, and in 2012, he became Vice President of the Cato Institute. Samples has been described as a "public intellectual" who "writes extensively on social media and speech regulation", and who "advocates against restrictions on online expression".

His 2002 edited book, James Madison and the Future of Limited Government, was reviewed by The Independent Review as "a debater’s handbook", in which Samples' piece "introduces us to Madison the advocate of direct democracy". Samples' 2010 book, The Struggle to Limit Government, was criticized as being too generous to the rhetoric of Ronald Reagan, characterized in the book as the only recent Republican president to uphold principles of limited government, though government grew under his watch as it did under others. In May 2020, he was selected to serve as one of the 20 founding members of Facebook's Oversight Board.

== Books ==
- James Madison and the Future of Limited Government (Cato Institute, 2002)
- With Chris Edwards, The Republican Revolution 10 Years Later: Smaller Government or Business as Usual? (Cato Institute, 2005)
- With Michael P. McDonald, The Marketplace of Democracy: Electoral Competition and American Politics (Brookings Institution Press, 2007)
- The Fallacy of Campaign Finance Reform (University of Chicago Press, 2008)
- The Struggle to Limit Government: A Modern Political History (Cato Institute, 2010)
