= Brent C. Harris =

American attorney

Brent C. Harris is an American attorney who worked on the National Commission on the BP Deepwater Horizon Oil Spill and Offshore Drilling, and later served as Director of Global Affairs for Facebook, where he was instrumental in developing Facebook's Oversight Board.

== Early life, education, and career ==
Born in Norman, Oklahoma, Harris received a B.A. and M.A. from Stanford University in 2004, after which he worked for the Hewlett Foundation for two years. He received a J.D. from Stanford Law School in 2009, where he was editor of Stanford Law Review. While at Stanford, he performed pro bono legal work to assist with the establishment of "the first farmers market in East Palo Alto", which had previously lacked options for residents to buy fresh produce.

In 2011, Harris was one of four staff counsels to the National Commission on the BP Deepwater Horizon Oil Spill and Offshore Drilling. After his work with the commission was done, Harris served as a consultant for nonprofit organizations, and became known as "an expert in international regulation".

== Director of Global Affairs at Facebook ==
Between late 2017 and early 2018, Facebook hired Harris to become the company's Director of Global Affairs. Wired noted that "[s]ince [Harris] had worked on adjudicating the BP oil spill in the Gulf of Mexico, he was well-placed to deal with the gushers of offensive content on Facebook's platform". In March 2018, shortly after Harris had joined the company, the harvesting of Facebook data by Cambridge Analytica was reported, and Harris began focusing on the establishment of Facebook's Oversight Board. In its early stages, it was described as follows:

This team came to be called the Governance and Strategic Initiatives Team, or Governance Team. ... The Governance team led by Harris has around ten direct employees as well as dozens of "cross-functional" employees, who work on the Governance Team and in other areas of Facebook. Harris and the Governance Team report to Clegg, who in turn reports directly to Zuckerberg.

One observer of the process noted that Harris led the drafting of the charter and bylaws, which initially "included a lot of dry, careful legal language". Harris engaged in various activities in support of the establishment of the Oversight Board, including writing articles, and headlining the public consultation on the initiative in cities around the world, including in his hometown of Norman.

Following the initiation of operations of the body, Harris disputed characterizations of the Oversight Board as a means for Facebook to "duck responsibility for its toughest decisions". Harris was also noted as having said that Facebook "will implement the board's decisions 'unless they violate the law'". In an interview with CNN Business, Harris indicated that the company had left the timetable for handling of election-related cases with the Board, stating, "[w]e don't, from the Facebook side, want to add undue pressure to them", and that it was "really a question for them as to when are they ready".
