= Katherine Chen =

Facebook Oversight Board member

Yi-Ning Katherine Chen (Chinese: 陳憶寧) is a Taiwanese professor and former national communications regulator who teaches public relations and statistics at National Chengchi University. As of 2021, she serves as a member of Facebook's independent Oversight Board.

== Education and career ==
Chen attended Taipei First Girls' High School and received a B.S. in plant pathology from the National Taiwan University in 1988, followed by an M.S. in that field from the same institution in 1990. She received a second M.S. in journalism from National Chengchi University in 1996, and a Ph.D. in that subject from the University of Texas at Austin in 1999.

Chen became a professor at National Chengchi University in 2004 and served as Associate Dean of the College of Communication there from 2010 to 2014, when she became a member of the National Communications Commission in 2014. She continued to teach as a professor concurrently with that service, which continued until 2018. Chen's research has focused on "social media, mobile news, and privacy". In May 2020, Chen was one of twenty professionals from around the world named to the Facebook's independent Oversight Board, an independent body tasked with making consequential precedential determinations about content moderation decisions made by Facebook and Instagram.

Chen had also planned to publish a research paper on the 2020 Taiwanese presidential election at the Chinese University of Hong Kong, but by September 2020, she had become concerned that the newly implemented Hong Kong national security law would jeopardize her ability to do so. In July 2023, following a recommendation from the oversight board to deplatform Cambodian head of state Hun Sen, the government of Cambodia listed Chen as one of 22 people connected with Meta who were banned from entering the country.
