= Emi Palmor =

Israeli lawyer and senior civil servant (born 1966)

- אמי פלמור
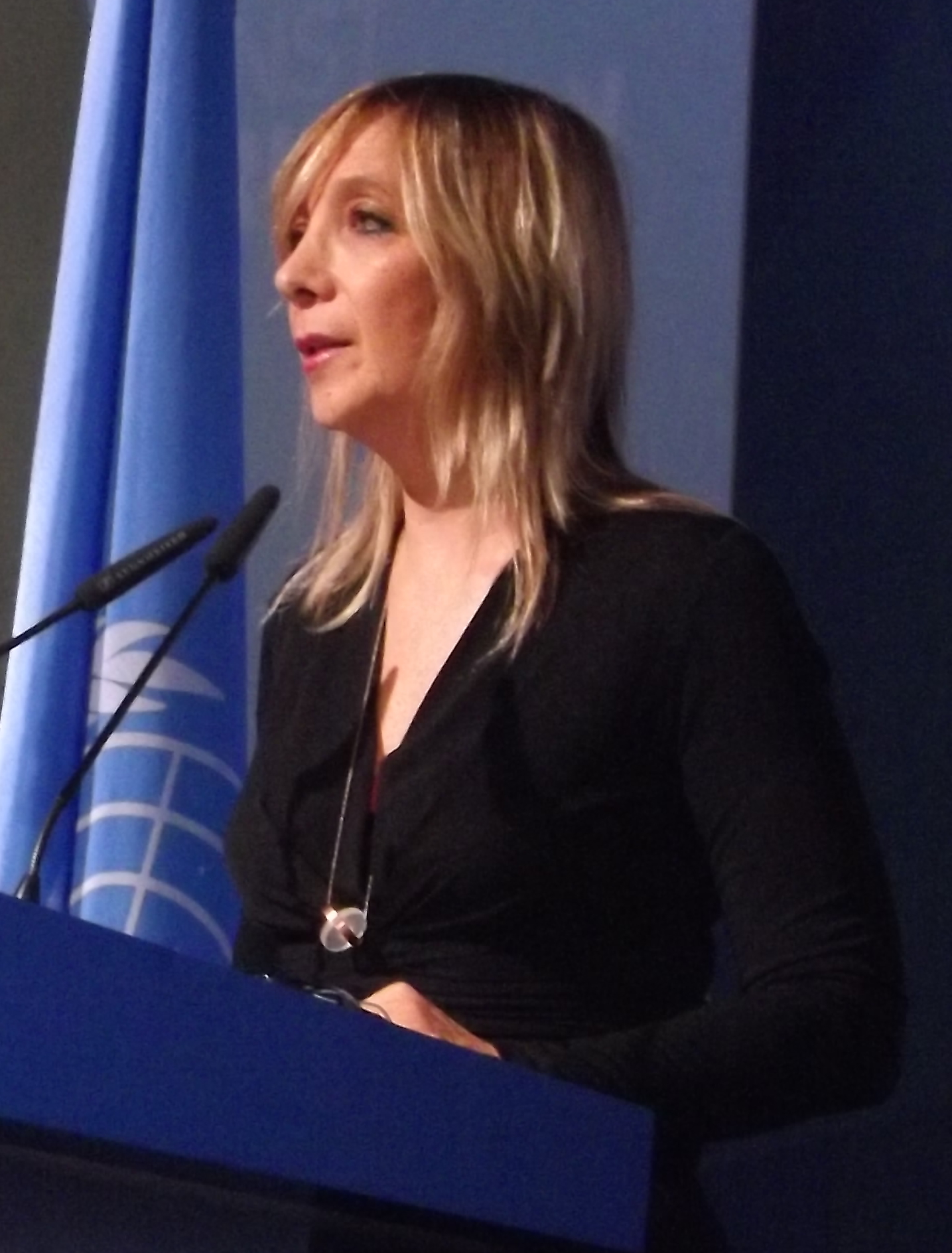
- Born: Jerusalem
- Citizenship: Israeli
- Title: Former Director General of the Israeli Ministry of Justice

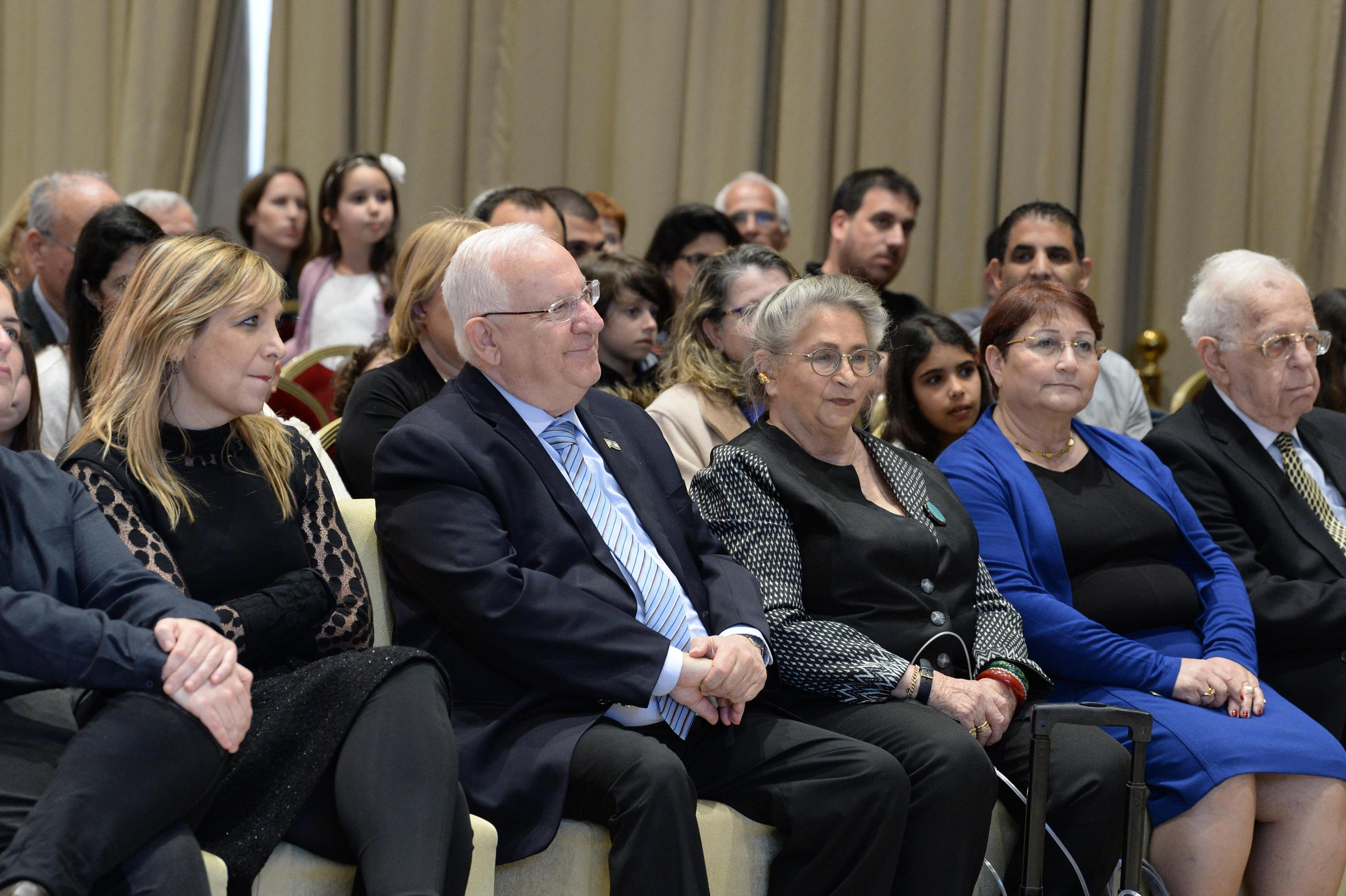
Emi Palmor (left) with Reuven Rivlin granting the president's scholarship for research to students, February 2018

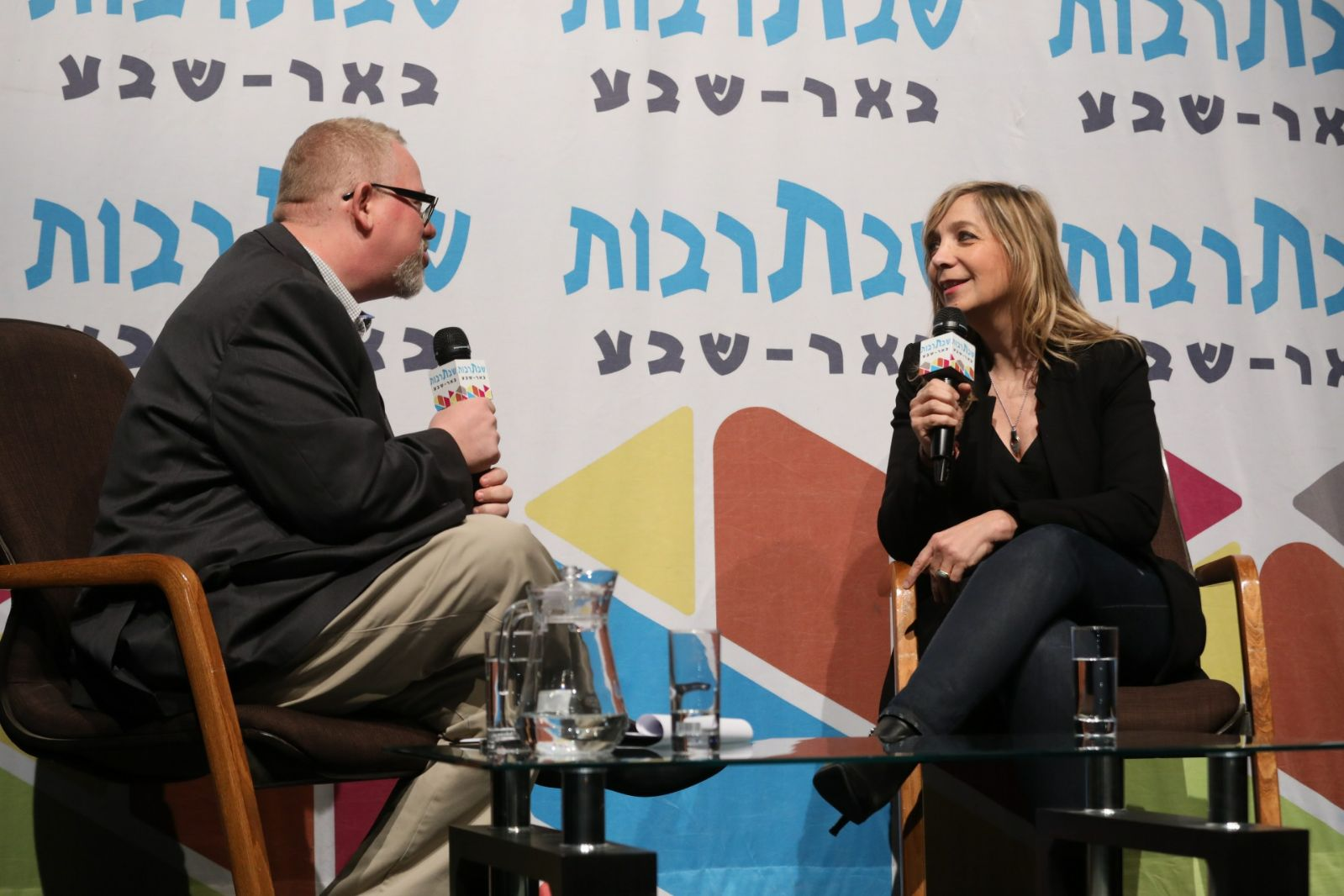
Roy Katz interviewing Emi Palmor, May 2018

Emi Palmor (Hebrew: אמי פלמור; born August 1966) is an Israeli lawyer and senior civil servant who served as the Director General of the Ministry of Justice from 1 February 2014 to September 2019. During her 24 years of civil service, she was appointed time and again by the government to chair public committees concerning sensitive and controversial social and legal issues in Israeli society, which she led to sustainable resolutions. Palmor is recognized for applying methods of civic engagement and participation in Government processes of policy design, and for promoting a holistic approach to public policy, focusing on prevention and education plans rather than legislation and law enforcement. Palmor is one of the first 20 members of the Facebook Oversight Board.

== Biography ==
Palmor was born in Jerusalem to Holocaust survivor parents who immigrated from Romania to Israel in 1960. Her father, Eliezer, served as a diplomat at the Israeli embassies in Belgium, Norway, Argentina, Uruguay, and France. Her mother, Shoshana, a concentration camp survivor from Transnistria, was a chemist and worked in a drug factory. Palmor's first name, Emi, consists of the first letters of the names of her grandmother Esther and her great-grandmother Michal, who perished both in the Holocaust.

She did her military service in Unit 8200 of the Israeli Intelligence Corps, between the years 1984–1986. In 1990, Palmor graduated law school from the Hebrew University and interned with Supreme court Judge Zvi Tal in the Jerusalem District Court and with Yair Golan (in the criminal field). Her brother, Yigal Palmor, is the Director of International Relations of the Jewish Agency, and previously served as the Spokesman of the Ministry of Foreign Affairs.

=== Professional career ===
From 1991 to 1996, Palmor worked as a lawyer in the field of Civil Law at the law firm of Carmeli-Arnon in Jerusalem and was accepted as a partner in the firm in 1995. From 1996 to 1999, she served as a prosecutor at the State Attorney's Office Supreme Court Department in the Ministry of Justice and conducted legal proceedings in the criminal field. In 2000, Palmor was appointed Director of the Pardons department at the Ministry of Justice, a position she held for 14 years, during which she was credited with preparing the Minister of Justice's recommendation to the President.

Furthermore, Palmor served on behalf of the Minister of Justice on special missions related to locating missing IDF soldiers. She was a member of the committee that dealt with the release of security prisoners to the Palestinian Authority, and through the years 2006–2011 was the only female member of the negotiation team for the release of POW a Gilad Shalit.

Palmor held in addition to her role as Director of the Pardons Department the following positions:

- Chairman of the Eligibility Committee for Victims of Death Offenses (in cooperation with the Israel Police and the Ministry of Welfare)
- Chairman of the Medical Ethics Committee of the Prison Service
- Member of the Kanai Committee for the Amendment of the Criminal Registry Law
- Council member of the Prisoner Rehabilitation Authority
- Judge in the Disciplinary Court of Appeals of the Prison Service

=== Director General of the Ministry of Justice ===
On 1 February 2014, Palmor was appointed Director General of the Ministry of Justice in place of Dr. Guy Rothkopf, after being selected by the government at the suggestion of Justice Minister Tzipi Livni. Palmor's appointment was a non-political appointment, as she came from the civil service itself. She continued to serve as a non-political Director General after Ayelet Shaked was appointed Minister of Justice in May 2015.

Upon taking office and under her leadership she emphasized the role and mission of the Ministry of Justice as a social service-providing ministry, advancing equality and developing better and innovative access to justice alongside its traditional roles. She led a series of organizational reforms and established new departments, units and tribunals, while developing legal services and digital platforms.

In the second half of 2015, under Palmor's oversight, the Ministry created the Cyber Unit, successfully resulting in the removal of tens of thousands of Palestinian posts from social media platforms which according to Adalah, a Palestinian human rights organization based in Haifa, "made requests to the Israeli state attorney, appealing to 'Facebook and Google to remove, restrict or suspend access to certain content, pages or users.'" This was done through "no transparency or legal procedure whatsoever, and with no framework for users to defend themselves against allegations that their posts were illegal or warranted removal." In a letter sent to the office of the Attorney General Avichai Mandelblit on 2 August 2017, Adalah attorney Fady Khoury alleged that the unit's censorship operations were conducted without any basis in Israeli law: "Nothing in the law allows state authorities to censor content based solely on an administrative determination… that the content amounts to a criminal offense. Likewise, there is no explicit directive in [Israeli] law authorizing the removal of content determined to amount to a criminal offense, even by a court."

On 23 July 2019, it was surprisingly announced that Palmor would end her position as director general of the Ministry of Justice. The temporary Justice Minister, Amir Ohana, had chosen to replace Palmor over Ophir Cohen, a close friend of his. Since Ohana himself was only a temporary appointment, it was considered a controversial decision, as this position was usually retained by its incumbent as part of the professional staff of a ministry. Palmor's dismissal drew widespread criticism and the High Court of Justice has put a temporary freeze on the appointment. Eventually, Palmor ended her tenure and on September.

==== Reforms ====
During her tenure, Palmor initiated, led, and implemented numerous important reforms in the Ministry of Justice, the justice system, and the entire government:

- Led governmental initiative of social rights accessibility through "All Rights" website ("Kol Zchut");
- Initiated and led the reform in the CPA training and certification;
- Led the reform of digital transformation of Land Registration services;
- Planned and implemented a five-year plan to improve regulation which led to a significant improvement in the State of Israel's ranking in the World Bank's Doing Business Index.
- Established the Entry to Israel Law Review Tribunals.
- Initiated and implemented the organizational reform and streamlining of the administrative courts in the field of immigration,
- Led the integration and expansion of Community Courts, initiative within the Ministry, and significantly developed the Sharia Tribunals whose judges (Kadi) were doubled during her tenure.
- Expanded the free legal services given by the Legal Aid and the Public Defense to deprived populations.
- Led the coordination between government bodies in the process of the State of Israel joining the FATF to combat money laundering and terrorist financing.

==== Human capital and employment diversity ====
Palmor is considered a pioneer in the field of occupational diversity in the entire government. She was the first director general to publish a transparent and detailed annual report on the degree of occupational diversity in the Ministry, which was later adopted by President Reuven Rivlin and other Ministries. She developed methods of recruitment and training as well as educational programs for organizations to promote a work environment that encourages diversity and inclusion for Arabs, Israelis of Ethiopian descent, Ultra-Orthodox Jews, Women, and people with disabilities, all poorly represented in the Civil Service. Palmor's initiatives and dedication to the subject have made her a National figure identified with occupational diversity moves and a sought-after spokesperson and lecturer on the subject throughout the government and the Business sector as well. On the 68th Independence Day of the State of Israel, she was selected by the Israel Democracy Institute to light an "alternative torch" for her unique contribution to the public trust in the public service by relentlessly promoting diversity of the Civil Service. In December 2019, she received the "Shared Society Award" by The Abraham Initiatives NGO in recognition of her longstanding contribution to advancing equality, understanding, and co-existence between Jewish and Arab citizens of Israel, advocating against racism and exclusion, for integrating and representing Arab citizens in the civil service and establishing the Anti-Racism coordination Unit in the government.

In October 2018 Palmor was first to initiate and publish a work-life balance convention in the Ministry of Justice, which limits contact hours with employees and allows for occupational flexibility, thus reducing employee's burnout, and advancing equality and improving opportunities for women and young parents in the workplace.

Additional positions she held during her tenure as Director General of the Ministry of Justice:

- Chair of Israel CPA Council
- Chair of the Governmental Committee for Integration of Arabs, Druze, and Circassian in Civil Service
- Chair of the Committee on the Agreement between the Government of Israel and the Baháʼí World Centre
- Chair of the Permanent Executive Committee for the Coordination of the Combat against Human trafficking
- Chair of the Joint Legal Committee for Israel and the Palestinian Authority
- Member of the Government Steering Committee for Improving and Streamlining Business Processes in Israel
- Member of the Israel Land Council and the National Planning and Construction Council
- Member of the Civil Service Committee
- Member of the National Council of the Israel Bar Association

=== Public Committees headed by Palmor ===
During her tenure, Palmor was appointed to head several public committees designated to deal with burning social issues on the government's agenda, including the Committee on The Eradication Of Racism against Israelis of Ethiopian Descent (2016), The Committee for Examination of Tools to Reduce Demand for Prostitution (2017), and the committee in charge of resolving the Negative Consequences of Polygamy (2017).

==== The Report on Eradication of racism against Israelis of Ethiopian origin and its outcomes ====
In February 2016, Palmor was appointed to head the committee on the Eradication of racism against Israelis of Ethiopian Descent by the Ministerial Committee for the Promotion of the integration of Israeli Citizens of Ethiopian origin into Israeli Society, headed by Prime Minister Benjamin Netanyahu.

The concluding report of the team (known as the "Palmor Report") was submitted in August 2016 and included an overview and reflection of the significant events experienced by Ethiopian Jews as manifestations of racism and discrimination, and is considered a historical milestone in Israel. The team led by Palmor presented more than 50 recommendations, which were adopted and budgeted by the government, and most of them were fully implemented. This was the first time the State recognized the existence of institutional racism against Ethiopian Jews, acknowledged policing and controversial policies on matters of education, health treatment, and other issues. Further, The Palmor report is taught in Universities and often cited and used in the Courts by Defense Attorneys and Judges, including at the Supreme Court, as a benchmark for evaluating practices of racial discrimination by the police and the Legal System.

Key recommendations:

- The establishment of a Government Coordination Unit to combat racism, which will concentrate government activities in the prevention of discrimination and racist policies and behavior of civil servants, will be a dedicated address for effective and professional concentration and handling of complaints received from all citizens, regarding racism and discrimination and will serve as a guide for legally competent bodies.
- Appointment of a designated officer in all government ministries, who will serve as an office address for filing complaints and referring them to a competent body according to law, will coordinate the ministry's actions on prevention of racism and advise the Director General in the relevant professional areas.
- Taking disciplinary action against civil servants and against regulated professionals who are accused of "racial harassment".
- Applying a pilot initiative initiated by the police regarding the carrying of body cameras at police stations in cities with a high proportion of Ethiopians;
- Establishing procedures regarding "profiling"- the implementation of the authority of police officers to contact citizens with a request for identification and the manner of exercising the authority when the certificate is not presented as requested
- Increasing the use of content and books on Jewish Ethiopian history and heritage.
- Establishing a database of experts of Ethiopian descent to promote a positive presence in the media.

Two years after the Palmor Report was accepted by the Government, Palmor initiated and convinced the President of Israel and the Minister of Justice to implement a special pardon scheme for Ethiopians, to erase their criminal record that resulted from police profiling and harassment.

==== Reducing prostitution consumption ====
In June 2016, Justice Minister Ayelet Shaked appointed Palmor to head a Committee to examine tools for reducing prostitution in Israel mainly to examine the possibility of criminalizing the use of prostitution, longtime demanded by a large coalition of female Knesset Members. The final recommendations of Palmor's Committee led to a historical bill imposing fines on consumers of prostitution, accompanied by a comprehensive rehabilitation plan for sex workers, and governmental programs in the field of education and social welfare for the prevention of future prostitution.

==== The committee of the negative consequences of polygamy ====
In January 2017, the government appointed Palmor to head the inter-ministerial committee to deal with the negative consequences of polygamy. Polygamy exists in Israel primarily in its Bedouin community that live in the Negev. The team sought to crack down on the practice through expanded police enforcement alongside anti-polygamy education in Bedouin schools and funding for programs that boost women's education, employment, healthcare and empowerment. The team's conclusions were submitted in a concluding report published in July 2018 and approved by Cabinet Ministers. Palmor spent a year meeting with Beduin women in southern Israel to develop the government's plan', and once its 84 recommendations were published it drew criticism for trying to balance between discouraging the practice, while recognizing it cannot be immediately eliminated and surprisingly endorsed temporary permission to Sharia Courts to register such marriages under specific circumstances.

=== After her tenure in the Ministry of Justice ===
In May 2020, Palmor was selected to be one of the first 20 members of the Oversight Board, an entity that makes content moderation decisions on Facebook, specifically about handling appeals for blocked or removed content.

As of 2020, Palmor is the Chair of the Gesher Multicultural Film Fund that works to bridge the gaps between the multiculturalism that characterizes Israeli society, and its representation in cinema and television, and Chair of the 2021 Sapir Prize for Literature, the most prestigious annual literary award in Israel.

Palmor is also an adjunct lecturer and teaches Governance, Public Policy and Law at the Interdisciplinary Center Herzliya in the Lauder School of Government, Diplomacy and Strategy.

Since October 2020, Palmor is a member of the board of governors of the Hebrew university in Jerusalem.

=== Activities for the community ===
Palmor has initiated, in collaboration with the Ministry of Education, an educational project, named "Private in public", to prevent online sexual harassment and promote children's awareness of privacy online. As part of the project, hundreds of attorneys and employees of the Ministry of Justice volunteered to deliver thousands of lessons in middle schools and high schools across the country about the dangers of dissemination of visual private content on social media and the social and criminal consequences it can have. The project lasted for four consecutive years (2015–2018) involved hundreds of schools across the country and was accompanied by a TV and online campaign of video clips funded by the Ministry of Justice aimed both at children and their parents, to prevent incrimination of minors and possible mental damages to potential victims.

Personal and professional mentoring – including the mentoring program of the Hebrew University graduates' organization, The Master's Program in Public Policy of the School of Public Policy and Government at the Hebrew University, She's Women's Mentoring Program for Women's Empowerment Mentoring Programs for Ethiopian Israelis, Co-Impact program for the Breakthrough in Arab Employment and the Mentoring Program for the Development of Female Leadership by the Civil Service Commission "Mentors in the Civil Service".

Instruction of at-risk youth at the Kiryat Ye'arim boarding school – instruction in law and current affairs classes for at-risk youth between the years 2009–2014.
