= Stephen Neal (lawyer) =

American lawyer

Stephen C. Neal is an American attorney who is the chairman and former chief executive officer (CEO) of Cooley LLP, and former chairman of the board of directors of Levi Strauss & Co.

== Career ==
Neal graduated from Harvard University with an AB in 1970 and from Stanford Law School with a JD in 1973.

In 1988, Neal successfully argued Grobow v. Perot, in which the Delaware Supreme Court upheld General Motors' buy-out of Ross Perot under the business judgment rule.

Neal joined Cooley in 1995, having previously been a partner at Kirkland and Ellis in Chicago. He was named chairman and CEO in 2001; he stepped down as CEO in 2007, but continues to hold the chairman position.

In 1998, Neal joined the board of trustees of the Monterey Bay Aquarium. He became vice chairman in 2005 and chairman in 2013.

In 2006 Stephen Neal was named by The National Law Journal as one of "The 100 Most Influential Lawyers in America". In September 2009, he was named in The Los Angeles Daily Journal's Top 100 Lawyers in California list.

In 2006, Neal joined the William and Flora Hewlett Foundation as a member of the board, and became its chairman in 2015.

Neal joined the board of directors for Levi Strauss & Co. in 2007, and was named chairman of the board in September 2011.

Since 2021, he has been chair of the board of trustees overseeing the Oversight Board of Meta, which oversees the activities of Facebook and Instagram.
