= Endy Bayuni =

Indonesian journalist

- Born: Endy Mouzardi Bayuni; 5 March 1957 (age 69); Jakarta, Indonesia
- Occupation: Journalist
- Organization: The Jakarta Post
- Spouse: Ida Rusdati Ismail

Endy M. Bayuni (born 3 May 1957) is an Indonesian journalist, who served as chief editor of The Jakarta Post daily newspaper from 2004 to 2010 and 2016 to 2018. He is a co-founder and executive director of the International Association of Religion Journalists. In May 2020, he was named an inaugural member of Facebook's Oversight Board.

== Early life and education ==
Endy Mouzardi Bayuni was born in Jakarta on 3 May 1957 to Rasyid Bayuni and Azhar Musa, both from Bukittinggi, West Sumatra. Endy's middle name, Mouzardi, was chosen because of his father's fondness for the music of Wolfgang Amadeus Mozart.

His father worked as a diplomat, so Endy grew up in Burma (1958–59), Thailand (1960–64), Jakarta (1968-1972), Argentina (1972-74) and Switzerland (1974). After Rasyid was assigned to Geneva, Switzerland, as a staff representative of Indonesia to the United Nations, Endy decided to continue his education in England, where his older brother, Satri Bayuni, was working for Natrabu travel agency.

Endy studied economics at Kingston University in Surrey and received his bachelor's degree in 1981.

== Career ==
After graduating from university, Endy joined his brother at Natrabu travel agency in London, sending British tourists to Indonesia. While applying for a work permit, he was ordered to leave England for working without permission. He returned to Jakarta in November 1982.

In Jakarta, Endy continued work for the travel agency. His parents hoped he would join the Foreign Affairs Ministry and work for the diplomatic corps, but Endy felt the salary of an Indonesia-based civil servant was too low.

In January 1983, the Kompas daily newspaper posted a job advertisement, seeking journalists for the forthcoming The Jakarta Post daily. Endy was hired by Sabam Siagian, the first editor-in-chief of The Jakarta Post, which commenced publication on 25 April 1983. Endy worked as a reporter on the city desk. His first article was about pedicab drivers facing unemployment after their profession was banned by the Jakarta administration.

Endy married Ida Rusdati Ismail, a Garuda flight attendant, whom he had met two years earlier in 1981 on a Jakarta-London flight. After one year of work at The Jakarta Post, Endy was promoted to the position of 'page one assistant'. When Ida gave birth to their first child, Lutfi Oscar Bayuni, Endy began looking for alternative employment with a higher salary. On 1 October 1984, he moved to Reuters news agency, where he enjoyed a higher salary and learned a higher standard of journalism. In 1986, he moved to Agence France-Presse. In 1991, he resumed work for The Jakarta Post as production manager, overseeing the nightly production of the newspaper.

In 2001, he was appointed deputy chief editor of The Jakarta Post. In August 2004, he was appointed chief editor. He stepped down from the position in 2010 to serve as a senior editor. He served as interim chief editor from 2016 to January 2018, after his predecessor, Meidyatama Suryodiningrat, was selected by President Joko Widodo to lead Indonesia's Antara state news agency. In his capacity as senior editor, Endy writes regular columns on Indonesian politics, foreign affairs, economic development, Islam and the changing media industry. In addition to writing columns, he also trains new journalists and organizes writing training for professionals.

== Organizations and fellowships ==
Endy has received several journalism fellowships, including Senior Fellow at the East West Center office in Washington in 2011, the Nieman Fellowship at Harvard University in 2003-04 and the Jefferson Fellowship at Hawaii University in 1999.

In 2016, he was elected executive director of the International Association of Religion Journalists (IARJ), which he co-founded in 2012.

He is a board member of several non-government organizations, including the Partnership for Governance Reform Indonesia, Nature Conservancy Indonesia, and the Institute for Policy Analysis of Conflict.

In May 2020, Endy was named a member of Facebook's Oversight Board. He likened the Board to a "supreme court", saying the independent body would consider freedom of expression and human rights principles when determining whether certain content on Facebook and Instagram should be removed or allowed to stay.

“I'm a Facebook user, and while I see the benefits of the platform, I also see big issues related to content. On the one hand, we have to protect freedom of speech, but we cannot let free speech lead to harassment or violence. I hope that as part of the Oversight Board I can help to address this balance.”
