= Nicolas Suzor =

Facebook Oversight Board member

Nicolas P. Suzor (born 30 September 1981) is an Australian legal scholar and an associate professor of law at the Queensland University of Technology (QUT). Since 2020, he has served as one of the inaugural members of Meta Platforms' independent Oversight Board, tasked with hearing . His academic work focuses on the governance of social networks, the regulation of automated systems, and internet governance.

== Education and career ==
Suzor earned his bachelor's, master's, and doctoral degrees from the Queensland University of Technology. In 2019 he published the book Lawless: The Secret Rules That Govern Our Digital Lives, which examines the hidden systems of governance that shape online behavior. At QUT, he is also affiliated with the university's Digital Media Research Centre and has studied technology regulation for the bulk of his career.

In 2012, Suzor published an article arguing that copyright law should be reformed in such a manner as to allow certain reuses of copyright material without the permission of the copyright owner where those derivatives are highly transformative and do not impact upon the primary market of the copyright owner. In 2022, Suzor coauthored a study with Rosalie Gillett on the Reddit's incelosphere, finding that punitive moderation often reinforced extremist beliefs rather than reducing them. As a Meta Oversight Board member, he has publicly commented on Meta's content moderation decisions, including the 2023 reinstatement of former U.S. president Donald Trump's Facebook account, and was among twenty-two Meta-affiliated individuals barred from entering Cambodia following the Board's recommendation to suspend the Facebook account of Prime Minister Hun Sen. In 2025, he warned that Meta's decision to scale back fact-checking could heighten tensions on its platforms.
