= Wolfgang Tillmans =

German photographer (born 1968)

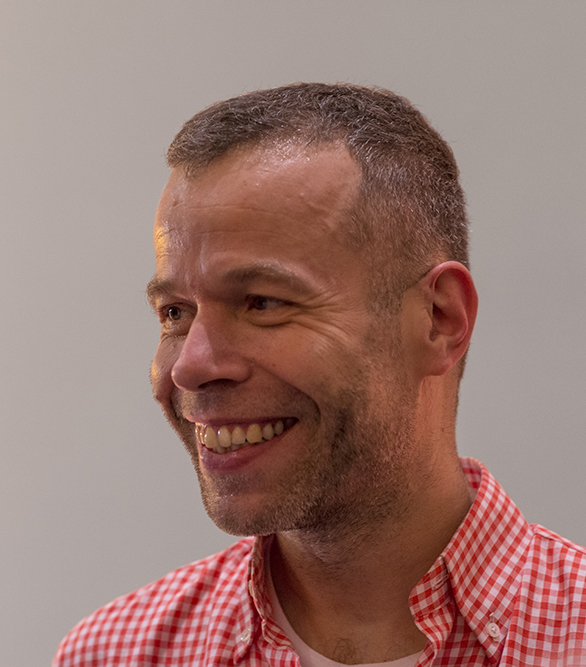
- Tillmans in 2013
- Born: 16 August 1968 (age 58); Remscheid, West Germany
- Education: Bournemouth and Poole College of Art and Design
- Known for: Photography
- Awards: Turner Prize; 2000; Culture Award; German Society for Photography 2009; Hasselblad Award; 2015; Order of Merit of the Federal Republic of Germany; 2018
- Website: www.tillmans.co.uk

Wolfgang Tillmans (born 16 August 1968) is a German fine-art photographer. His diverse body of work is distinguished by observation of his surroundings and an ongoing investigation of the photographic medium's foundations.

Tillmans was the first photographer, and first non-British person, to be awarded the Turner Prize. He has been the subject of large-scale retrospectives at the Museum of Modern Art, Tate Modern and Moderna Museet. In 2023, Tillmans was named one of the most influential people in the world by Time. He lives in Berlin and London.

== Early life and education ==
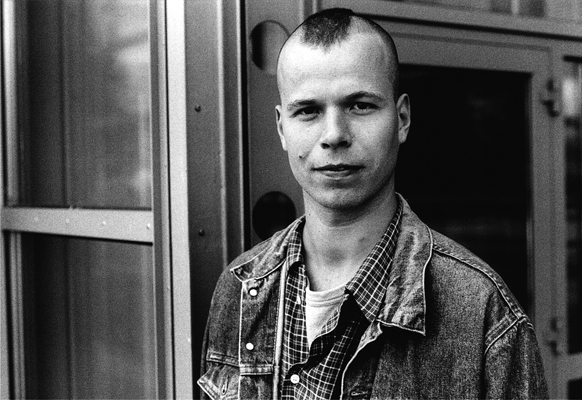
Tillmans in the 1990s

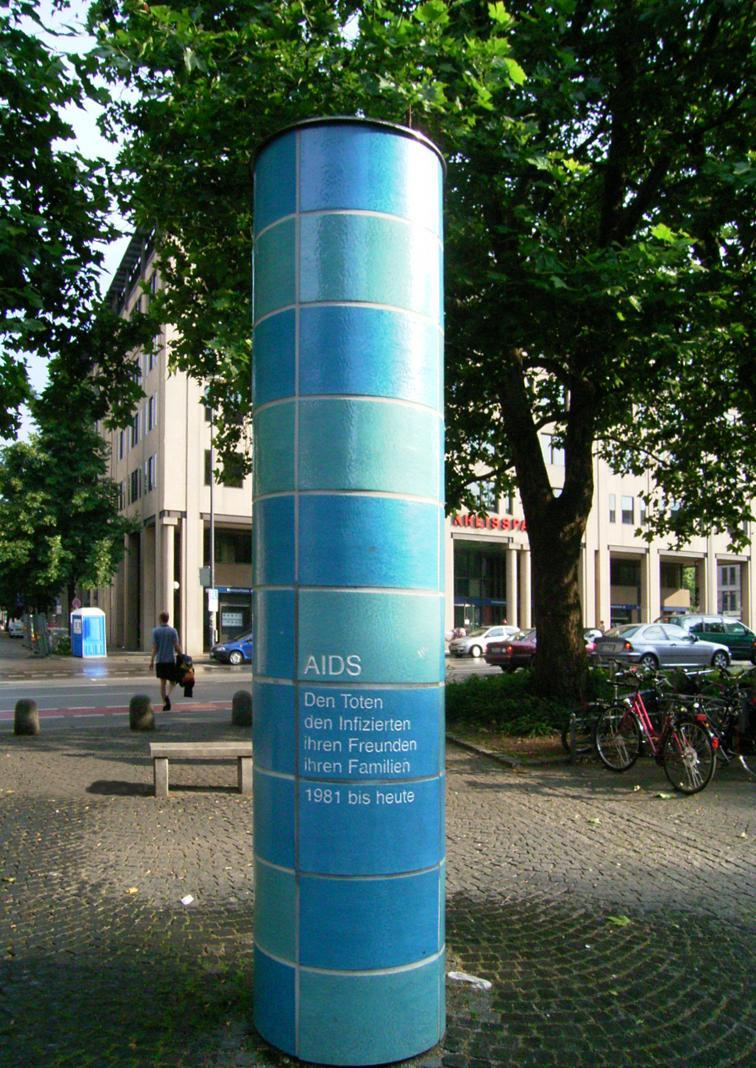
AIDS memorial in Munich

Tillmans was born in 1968 in Remscheid in the German area of Bergisches Land. At the age of 14 to 16, visits to museums in Düsseldorf and to the Museum Ludwig in Cologne acquainted him with the photo-based art of Gerhard Richter, Sigmar Polke, Robert Rauschenberg and Andy Warhol, which counts among his earliest influences. During his first visit to England as an exchange student in 1983, he discovered British youth culture and the local fashion and music magazines of the time. Also in high school, he became friends with Alexandra Bircken and Lutz Huelle.

From 1987 to 1990, Tillmans lived in Hamburg; there, in 1988, he had his first solo exhibitions, at Café Gnosa, Fabrik-Foto-Forum, and Front. From 1990 through 1992, he studied at the Bournemouth and Poole College of Art and Design in southern England.

== Work ==
After his studies, he moved to London and then to New York in 1994 for a year, where he met the German painter Jochen Klein. After moving back to England, Tillmans lived with Klein until Klein died of AIDS-related complications in 1997.

From 1995, Tillmans primarily lived and worked in London. During the summer of 1998, Tillmans participated in a month-long residency at the last active Shaker community in the world, in Sabbathday Lake, Maine.

Since 2007, Tillmans has divided his time between Berlin and London. In Berlin, his studio is located in an annex of a modernist building from the early 1930s, designed by the architect Max Taut.

=== Beginnings ===
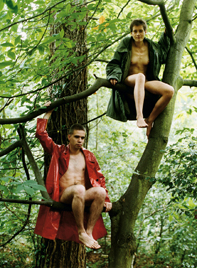
One of Tillmans' best known photos: "Lutz & Alex sitting in the trees" (1992). The couple was portrayed as "naive yet knowing, an Adam and Eve for the ecstasy generation".

Tillmans was initially known for his seemingly casual, sometimes snapshot-like portraits of friends (most notably, fashion designer Lutz Huelle and fellow artist Alexandra Bircken) and other youth in his immediate surroundings and scene. His photos – from the Europride in London (1992) or the Love Parade in Berlin (1992), for example – appeared in magazines such as i-D, Spex, Interview, SZ Magazin and Butt, and established his reputation as a prominent witness of a contemporary social movement. He was made co-editor of Spex in 1997. For the Index Magazine, he shot covers and assignments, including images of John Waters, Gilbert & George, and Udo Kier.

Tillmans was considered the "documentarian of his generation, especially that of the London club and gay scenes" (though he has said "It was never my intention to be seen as diaristic or autobiographical. I was not recording the world around me or my tribe or whatever. There is a big misunderstanding there that still persists to this day."). Half of his work is staged, with the artist choosing the clothes and the location, as well as setting his models up in their positions. The series of his friends Lutz and Alex, also published in i-D in 1992, are considered important photographic documents of the 1990s. In his early photographs of people, Tillmans portrayed freedom in a different way and he says: "I wanted to somehow represent what was not being represented elsewhere." From 1992 to 1994 Tillmans lived and worked in London, moving to New York in 1994. During this time, he began to show more frequently, developing an exhibition style that consisted of nonhierarchical arrangements of unframed photographs pinned or taped onto the gallery's walls. Color photographs are placed next to inkjet prints and next to postcards and magazine clippings of his own images, reaching almost to the ceiling and the floor. He views each exhibition as a site-specific installation, often addressing the exhibition space as a larger composition.

=== "Pictures, in order to see the world" ===
Tillmans' photographic practice subsequently developed to encompass a wide array of genres. His portraits, still lifes, sky photographs (e.g. the Concorde series), astrophotography, aerial shots and landscapes are motivated equally by aesthetic and political interests, especially related to homosexuality and gender identity. Tillmans says of his work: "I take pictures, in order to see the world." He produces images for installations in three sizes, from small to very large, and either in signed, mounted prints, which must be protected in a frame, or as replaceable inkjet prints that can be attached directly to the wall (the latter generated by a certificate-authenticated optical disc). They are installed in meticulous wall installations, sometimes combined with photocopies, and magazine and newspaper clippings (for example, in the installation "Soldiers – The Nineties"); or presented in vitrines, arranged in extensive table-installations ("truth study center"). Operating on the basis of the fundamental equality of all motifs and supports, through this continual re-arranging, repositioning, questioning and reinforcement, Tillmans avoids ascribing any 'conclusions' to his work and thus subjects his photographic vision to a perpetual re-contextualization.

In 2009, after Tillmans had been using an analog 50 mm Contax SLR camera almost exclusively for over two decades, he turned to digital photography. In 2012, he abandoned film altogether and became a full-time digital photographer. In an interview that year, he describes the corresponding change from using viewfinders to integrated camera monitors as "completely turning on its head the psychology of photography, which has always been a dialogue between photographer, object and the imaginary image that one is envisioning, thinking, hoping for." According to Tillmans, the higher resolution of digital photographs correlates to "a transformation in the whole world"; he further explains: "In recent years, everything has become HD, so I think it is inevitable that the overwhelming nature of this information density is reflected in my images. In this way, they again describe quite well my sense of perception today."

Wolfgang has a passion and love for the streets and the clubs. Which this two inspire him in his work along with his work in the gay rights movement.(Jobey, 2010).

==== Grids ====
The 56 photographs of equal dimensions that make up the Concorde Grid were taken in and around London as part of a commission for Tillmans' exhibition at Chisenhale Gallery in 1997. Shot from a wide range of places, including private gardens, parks, railway tracks, and the perimeter fence around Heathrow airport, they record the daily passing of the airplane. Total Solar Eclipse Grid (1998), a set of which was included in his Turner Prize installation and is now in the permanent collection of the Tate, documents the spectacle of a solar eclipse. Each of the 21 photographs in the grid was taken during the eclipse of his immediate surroundings in a tropical locale, with varying degrees of light and detail. Snow/Ice Grid (1999) is a grid of images of trampled and melting ice and snow.

==== Abstractions ====
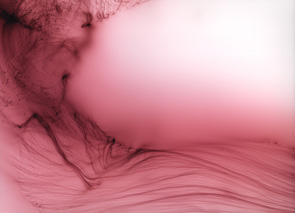
"Freischwimmer 26", 2003

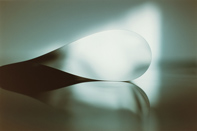
Paper drop (window), 2006

Tillmans exhibited his first abstract and damaged pictures as a Parkett edition in 1998. The edition, 60 unique works on color-negative photographic paper collected by the artist since he began colour printing in 1990, was a combination of true darkroom mistakes and years of darkroom experimentation that they inspired. The Silver works, which Tillmans has been creating since 1998, reflect the reaction of the photographic paper to light, as well as mechanical and chemical processes. The name Silver arises from the dirt traces and silver salt stains that remain on the paper when the artist develops the photographs in a machine that is filled with water and has not been completely cleaned.

Since 2000, Tillmans has become increasingly interested in the chemical foundations of photographic material, as well as its haptic and spatial possibilities. The "Conquistador" series of photographs were the first of these interventions to be exhibited. Later works created directly in the darkroom without the use of a camera, and often largely accidental (e.g. "Blushes", "Mental Pictures", and "Freischwimmer"), present photography as a self-referential medium – one that could serve as an experimental ground for the creation of a new type of image structure. These "abstract" works now appear next to the figurative photographs. In "Blushes", fine, thread-like lines, apparently drawn with light, swim over the surface of the photographic paper, and create delicate, fluid patterns.

Tillmans further explores the bounds of photography as a medium in his "paper drop" series (2001–08). He started to make 'paper drop' images depicting photographic paper specifically exposed to coloured light in his darkroom in 2001. He creates extraordinary sculptural forms in photographic paper; then, by photographing them, returns them to the accustomed flatness of that medium. Photography's step from 'picture' to 'object' is best demonstrated in the works from the "Lighter" Series (2005–08), in which the artist dropped the act of photographing and allowed the photographs - in their three-dimensional form – to only represent themselves, recalling his ongoing series "Impossible Color" (1996–present). These colourful photo-paper works are folded, creased or otherwise manipulated, allowing for a subtle play with the material surface and the resulting illusion of lines and contrast. Contained under plexiglas lids, they have a rather sculptural quality.

==== Photocopies ====
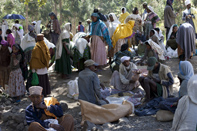
"Market", 2012

Tillman's first exhibition in 1988 was composed exclusively of images that were created with the latest kind of monochrome laser copier. He regards these so-called Approach pictures (1987–1988) as his "first work before [he] even owned a camera." Over the years, Tillmans has often returned to this medium. The ways that surface structure and image depth influence each other is shown in his large-format works whose original material is analogue photocopies (ongoing since 2006). Here he also references his earlier works from the end of the 1980s that he began in the course of experimenting with an old Canon photocopier. The uncontrolled contrasts and pigment particles in the images from these old machines are clear only after drastic enlargement (framed ca. 260 x 180 cm). The resulting effects are distanced but also concrete – created through not only the materiality of the printing process but also the play and variation of scale. With the analogue photocopy – probably the most ephemeral form of image (re)production – a system of values for images is brought into a critical light.

Commissioned by Tate Modern, Tillmans was on-site throughout the development of the museum's The Tanks galleries from 2012 until 2016, capturing each stage in a series of 176 shots. Turning his lens on building paraphernalia like scaffolding, walkie-talkies and sacks of cement, he manipulated his shots on an old photocopier that produces a single colour image after scanning a picture four times, 'distorting and shifting the colours so that each one is a unique work'.

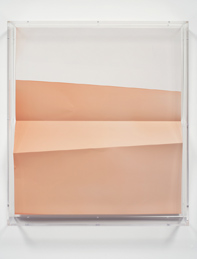
"Lighter V", 2006

==== Table works ("truth study center") ====
In 2005, at his major supporter Maureen Paley's gallery, Tillmans showed his large-scale display-case installation Truth Study Center. Going even further than his wall-installations, Tillmans' table works combine a diverse array of image formats and content. His own photographs are presented and arranged under glass next to extracts from books, newspapers, magazines, postcards, packaging and other found materials. The collage-like arrangements of the table displays produce an open-ness and potentiality in terms of aesthetics and content, while raising a critical question about the interpretive possibilities of the visible in a global information-society. With that, claims of absolute (in particular, religious) truth are caricatured, as if Tillmans would like to put them to a kind of test ("truth study center"). The works draw attention to the exercise of power behind the ideologies of Islamic fundamentalism, Catholicism, and capitalism.

=== Videos ===
In 1987, Tillmans began making videos, and he has exhibited them since 2002. In most, the camera barely moves, the sound is direct, and the only cuts occur when the camera is turned on and off. Lights (Body) (2000–2002), a video installation featuring static shots of the light effects inside an empty dance club, with the bass pulse of the 'Hacker Remix' of 'Don't be Light' by Air, is the first work by the photographer using the medium of film. The only indications of people on the crowded dance floor are the subtle vibrations and occasionally visible particles of dust. In 2002, Tillmans filmed a video clip for the pop band Pet Shop Boys' single "Home and Dry", composed almost entirely of shots documenting the mice living in the London Underground system. The film Kopierer (2010) depicts an open color laser copy machine, the CLC 1100, in the act of copying documents over a period of ten minutes.

=== Commissions ===
In 2001, Tillmans was awarded first prize in the competition for the design of the AIDS memorial for the City of Munich, whereupon the memorial was erected after his designs at the Sendlinger Tor.

In 2015, Tillmans was commissioned with creating the official portrait of retiring British Museum director Neil MacGregor, which was subsequently acquired by the museum as the first photograph portrait in a tradition stretching back 250 years.

In 2025, Tillmans designed the poster of the 78th Locarno Film Festival; it featured the festival’s iconic leopard resting on a tree branch, surrounded by a vivid mix of yellow and purple abstract patterns.

=== Music and art collaboration ===
In 2011, Tillmans collaborated with The Opiates by offering a range of photographs to accompany their Hollywood Under the Knife album and Rainy Days and Remixes EP.

A fan of the 1980s experimental synthpop group Colourbox, Tillmans curated an exhibition dedicated to the group, Music of the Band (1982 - 1987), at his Between Bridges gallery in 2014, and also selected the track list and provided original artwork for a tie-in compilation of the same name. The exhibition was the first to be held in the gallery's dedicated Playback Room, where visitors can listen to Tillmans' music selections on high-end speakers.

In 2016, Tillmans' track "Device Control" was included on American singer and rapper Frank Ocean's video album Endless. After Ocean met with Tillmans to discuss the use of his photography for Ocean's studio album Blonde, Tillmans sent Ocean two of his tracks after piquing his interest. Ocean later asked if he could sample the track, to which Tillmans agreed. Although Ocean was initially planning to only sample "Device Control", it was released in its entirety as an opening and ending of the video album.

In 2016, Tillmans visited witch house group Salem in Montegut, Louisiana and announced in a social media post that the group were working on a new album. The album in question, Fires in Heaven, was later released in 2020. In the same social media post, Tillmans noted that the group had remixed his track "Make It Up As You Go Along" from 1989, commenting, "As expected the mix is super dense, highly abstracted from the original, and has an irresistible magic and pull".

Tillmans has granted licenses to use his photographs for the covers of several books, including astro crusto, a (2012) for Crudo (2018) by Olivia Laing; The Cock (kiss) (2002) for Young Mungo (2022) by Douglas Stuart; and Love (hands in hair) (1989) for Hyperpolitics (2026) by Anton Jäger.

=== Between Bridges ===
Between Bridges is a non-profit exhibition space maintained by Tillmans in Berlin.

Between April 2006 and late 2011, Tillmans maintained the exhibition space in the ground floor of his Bethnal Green studio, a former umbrella factory named Moarain House, at 223 Cambridge Heath Road, London. The project's name is taken from a 1999 photograph by the artist, and also refers to the studio's physical location between two rail bridges. The space opened with a show of works by the New York artist and activist David Wojnarowicz. In the small gallery Tillmans developed a program of exhibitions with political art from other artists who he believed had not been given the attention they deserved, specifically in London. Exhibitions were held of work by Jenny Holzer, Wolfgang Breuer, David Wojnarowicz, Corita Kent, Charlotte Posenenske, Isa Genzken, the films of Len Lye, and photographs from the Center for Land Use Interpretation.

From 2014 to 2019, Between Bridges was based at a former artist studio and gallery in Tiergarten, Berlin. In 2022, it relocated to a six-story corner building Tillmans designed and built in the Kreuzberg district.

== Tillmans' Experience with AIDS ==
Tillmans contracted HIV at the age of 26 from his boyfriend Jochen Klein, a German painter and his collaborator on art during most of his life. Klein died from AIDS in 1997. Tillmans stated in his interview with the SHOWStudio's Lou Stoppard that after experiencing this he feels like life is fragile, and should not take advantage of it.

In the same interview with Stoppard, Tillmans talks about how some of his artwork has reflected how he felt about HIV and AIDS:

Tillmans' 2014 photograph, "17 Years' Supply", depicts a giant cardboard box filled with bottles of HIV drugs—some marked with Tillmans' own name. His work, as a whole, has also largely spoken to the LGBTQ experience: 2014's "Arms and Legs" is an erotic close-up of a male hand slipped underneath another man's red athletic shorts; 2012's "Juan Pablo & Karl, Chingaza" features two men smoking and laying [sic] together on a bed of grass.

To accompany an essay by Anthony Fauci, the New York Times asked Tillmans in 2022 to photograph Fauci — his first assignment for the newspaper. In addition to the photographs, the newspaper also published a conversation between Tillmans and Fauci on HIV.

== Books ==
- Wolfgang Tillmans. Cologne: Taschen, 1995, 2002. ISBN 978-3-8228-8853-7
- Wolfgang Tillmans. Zurich: Kunsthalle Zürich, 1995; JRP/Ringier, 2008. ISBN 978-3-905829-36-5
- Wolfgang Tillmans. Frankfurt am Main: Portikus, 1995
- Wer Liebe wagt lebt morgen. Ostfildern-Ruit: Kunstmuseum Wolfsburg, 1996
- Concorde. Cologne: Walther König, 1997. ISBN 978-3-88375-273-0
- Wolfgang Tillmans: Burg. ISBN 978-3-8228-7881-1
  - Cologne: Taschen, 1998
  - Reissued as Wolfgang Tillmans, 2002
- Totale Sonnenfinsternis. Cologne: Galerie Buchholz, 1999
- Wako Book 1999. Tokyo: Wako Works of Art, 1999
- Soldiers—The Nineties. Cologne: Walther König, 1999. ISBN 978-3-88375-377-5
- Wako Book 2. Tokyo: Wako Works of Art, 2001. ISBN 4-902070-19-7 (Note: It can be downloaded from http://tillmans.co.uk/images/stories/pdf/wakobook2_web.pdf.)
- Portraits. Cologne: Walther König / Distributed Art Publishers, 2001. ISBN 978-1-891024-36-8
- Aufsicht / View from Above. Ostfildern-Ruit: Hatje Cantz, 2001
- AC: Isa Genzken/Wolfgang Tillmans. Cologne: Museum Ludwig, Walther König, 2001
- Wolfgang Tillmans. London and New York: Phaidon, 2002. ISBN 0-7148-4192-7
- If One Thing Matters, Everything Matters. London: Tate, 2003
- Wako Book 3. Tokyo: Wako Works of Art, 2004. ISBN 4-902070-25-1 (Note: It can be downloaded from http://tillmans.co.uk/images/stories/pdf/wakobook3_web.pdf.)
- Freischwimmer. Tokyo: Tokyo Opera City Gallery, 2004
- truth study center. Cologne: Taschen, 2005. ISBN 3-8228-4640-6
- Freedom From The Known. New York and Göttingen: P.S.1/Steidl, 2006. ISBN 3-86521-263-8
- Wolfgang Tillmans. Los Angeles. New Haven and London: Museum of Contemporary Art, Chicago; Hammer Museum, Los Angeles, 2006. ISBN 0-300-12022-2 (Note: It can be downloaded from http://tillmans.co.uk/images/stories/pdf/WT_US_Tour_Catalogue_2006-07.pdf.)
- Why We Must Provide HIV Treatment Information. London: HIV i-Base, 2007. Photography by Tillmans. (Note: It can be downloaded from http://tillmans.co.uk/images/stories/pdf/HIV_book.pdf.)
- Sprengel Installation. Hannover: Sprengel Museum, 2007
- manual. Cologne: Walther König, 2007. ISBN 978-3-86560-132-2
- Wolfgang Tillmans and Hans Ulrich Obrist. The Conversation Series, Vol. 6. Cologne: Walther König, 2007. ISBN 978-3-86560-133-9
- Wako Book 4. Tokyo: Wako Works of Art, 2008. ISBN 978-4-902070-31-6 (Note: It can be downloaded from http://tillmans.co.uk/images/stories/pdf/wakobook4_low.pdf.)
- Lighter. Ostfildern and Berlin: Hatje Cantz and Hamburger Bahnhof—Museum für Gegenwart—Berlin, 2008. ISBN 978-3-7757-2187-5
- Wolfgang Tillmans: Interviews. Tokyo: Wako Works of Art, 2010
- Wolfgang Tillmans. London: Serpentine Gallery; Koenig Books, 2010 (Note: It can be downloaded from http://tillmans.co.uk/images/stories/pdf/SERPENTINE_CATALOGUE_web.pdf.)
- Wolfgang Tillmans. Brochure. Liverpool: Walker Art Gallery, 2010 (Note: It can be downloaded from http://tillmans.co.uk/images/stories/pdf/2010_Tillmans_at_Walker_Art_Gallery_web.pdf.)
- Abstract Pictures. Ostfildern: Hatje Cantz, 2011
- Zachęta Ermutigung. Zachęta Narodowa Galeria Sztuki, Kunstsammlung Nordrhein-Westfalen, Düsseldorf, 2011 (Note: It can be downloaded from http://tillmans.co.uk/images/stories/pdf/zacheta_catalogue_komplett_web.pdf.)
- FESPA Digital / FRUIT LOGISTICA. Artist book. Cologne: Walther König, 2012
- Neue Welt. Cologne: Taschen, 2012. ISBN 978-3-8365-3974-6
- Wolfgang Tillmans. London and New York: Phaidon, 2013. ISBN 978-0-7148-6704-5.

== Discography ==
- 2016/1986 EP (Fragile Records, 2016)
- Device Control EP (Fragile Records, 2016)
- "Device Control" – included on Endless (2016) video album by Frank Ocean
- "Source (Roman Flügel Remixes & Original)" (Fragile Records, 2018)

== Exhibitions ==
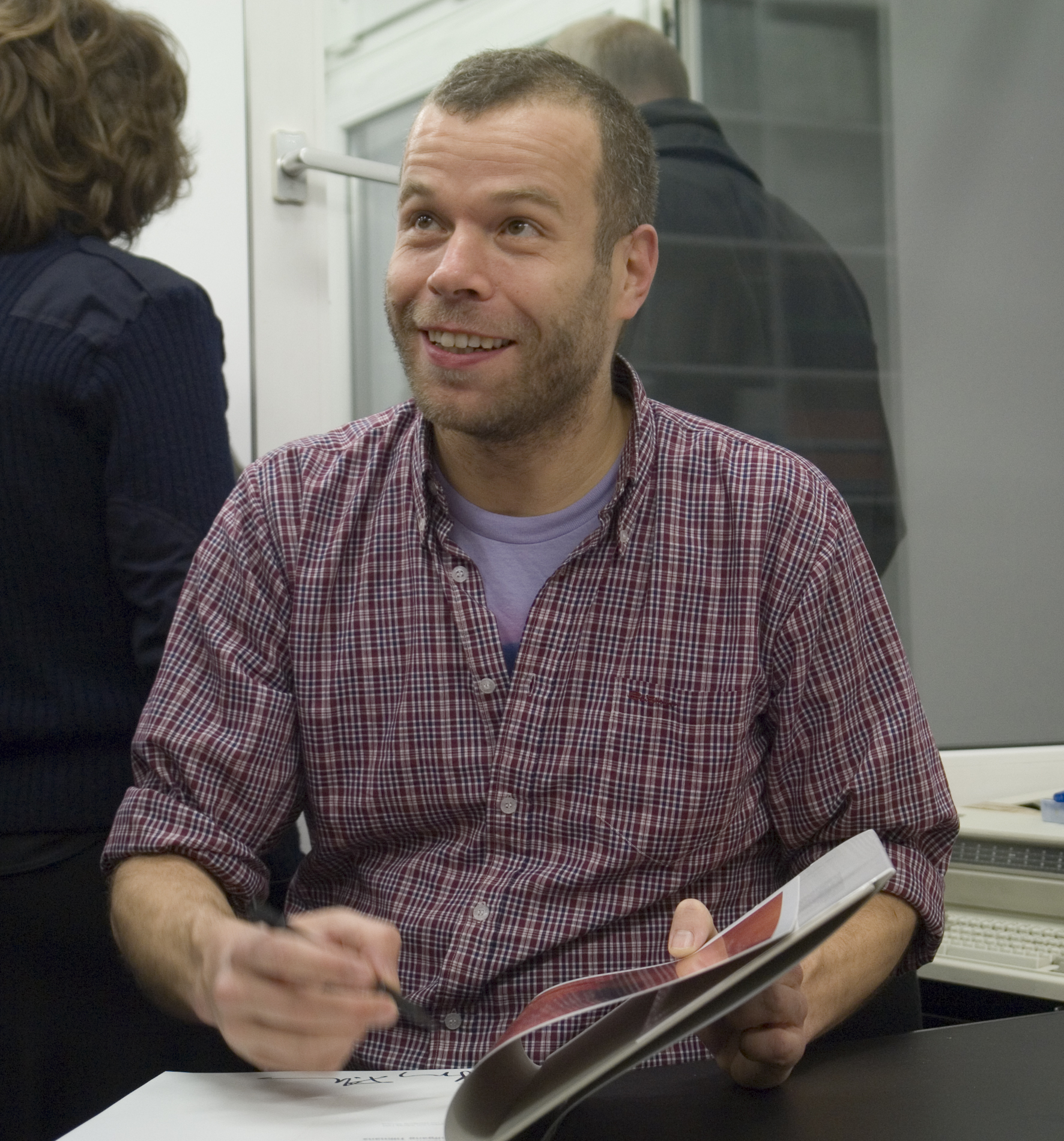
Tillmans at a book signing in 2007

Despite having already exhibited in Hamburg, in 1993 Tillmans held his first exhibition at the Galerie Buchholz in Cologne. In 1995 his work was included at a show at the Serpentine Gallery in London, curated by Hans-Ulrich Obrist. Tillmans' work has since been shown in large solo exhibitions at European museums, for example the Kunsthalle Zürich (1995), Museo Nacional Centro de Arte Reina Sofía in Madrid (1998), Museum Ludwig in Cologne (2001), Castello di Rivoli in Italy (2002), Palais de Tokyo in Paris (2002), the Hamburger Bahnhof in Berlin (2008), and Serpentine Gallery in London (2010).

Tate Britain's extensive mid-career retrospective of Tillmans' work was shown in 2003. In 2006, MoMA PS1 presented Tillmans' first exhibition for an American museum. That same year, the Hammer Museum in Los Angeles mounted Tillman's first major retrospective in the US, which travelled to the Museum of Contemporary Art in Chicago and the Hirshhorn Museum and Sculpture Garden, Washington D.C. In 2010 he took part in exhibition FAX, Torrance Art Museum, California. His first South American exhibition was shown at the São Paulo Museum of Modern Art in 2012. In 2005 and in 2009, Tillmans was included in the Venice Biennale.

In 2004, the Portikus, Frankfurt, invited Tillmans to curate "Inventory / Scott King / Donald Urquhart", an exhibition presenting three artistic positions from London. The Stedelijk Museum, Amsterdam, entrusted Tillmans with the role of a guest curator in 2008, inviting him to present a personal choice of works by Isa Genzken, Roberto Matta, and Ellsworth Kelly from the museum's collection.

Tillmans carefully designs his exhibitions, in which printed, audiovisual and sometimes textile materials interact with the space they are exhibited in. This preoccupation, together with a rigorous attention to detail (as the pins, clips and tape used for hanging the pictures), has led him to have a dedicated team for setting up his exhibitions. The members of this team are Danish sculptor Anders Clausen, Chilean biologist and architect Federico Martelli (since 2006), and Colombian artist Juan Echeverri (since 2012).

=== Solo exhibitions ===
- Kunsthalle Zürich, 1995 (exh. cat.)
- Portikus, Frankfurt, Frankfurt am Main, Germany, 1995 (exh. cat.)
- I Didn't Inhale, Chisenhale Gallery, London, 1997.
- Isa Genzken, Wolfgang Tillmans, Museum Ludwig, Cologne, Germany, 2001 (exh. cat.)
- View from Above/Aufsicht, Deichtorhallen, Hamburg, Germany, 2001
- Vue d'en Haut, Palais de Tokyo, Paris, 2002; Veduta dall'alto, Castle of Rivoli/Museo d'Arte Contemporanea, Rivoli, Italy, 2002 (exh. cat.)
- Frans Hals Museum, Haarlem, Netherlands
- if one thing matters, everything matters, Tate Britain, London, 2003 (exh. cat.)
- View From Above, Louisiana Museum of Modern Art, Humlebœk, Denmark, 2003 (exh. cat.)
- Wolfgang Tillmans, Regen Projects, Los Angeles, 2004
- Freedom From The Known, MoMA PS1, New York, 2006 (exh. cat.); Museum of Contemporary Art, Chicago; Hammer Museum, Los Angeles; Hirshhorn Museum and Sculpture Garden, Washington DC, 2007 (exh. cat.); Pinakothek der Moderne (permanent collection), Munich
- Beugung, Kunstverein München, Munich, 2007
- Lighter, Hamburger Bahnhof Museum fur Gegenwart, Berlin, 2008 (exh. cat.); Museo Tamayo, Mexico City, Mexico
- Serpentine Gallery, London, 2010 (exh. cat.)
- Moderna Museet, Stockholm, 2012
- Museo de Arte del Banco de la República, Bogotá, 2012
- Stedelijk Room, Stedelijk Museum Amsterdam, 2012 (permanent exhibition as part of the collection)
- New World, Andrea Rosen Gallery, New York, 2013
- Book for Architects, Metropolitan Museum of Art, New York, 2015
- Your Body is Yours, National Museum of Art, Osaka, Osaka, 2015
- PCR, David Zwirner Gallery, New York, 2015
- Wolfgang Tillmans: 2017, Tate Modern, London, 2017.
- Wolfgang Tillmans: Fragile Johannesburg Art Gallery, Johannesburg, 2018
- Wolfgang Tillmans: How likely is it that only I am right in this matter?, David Zwirner, New York
- Wolfgang Tillmans: Today is the first day Wiels, Brussels, 2020
- Sound is Liquid Mumok, Vienna, 2021/22
- Wolfgang Tillmans: To Look Without Fear, Museum of Modern Art, New York, 2022–2023
- Wolfgang Tillmans: To Look Without Fear, Art Gallery of Ontario, Toronto, 2023
- Wolfgang Tillmans: To Look Without Fear, Museum of Modern Art, San Francisco, 2024

=== Group exhibitions ===
- Manifesta 10, St. Petersburg, Russia, 2014

== Other activities ==
=== Teaching ===
Following a guest professorship at the University of Fine Arts of Hamburg from 1998 to 1999 and an Honorary Fellowship at the Arts University Bournemouth in 2001, Tillmans was a professor for Interdisciplinary Art at the Städelschule in Frankfurt am Main from 2003 to 2006.

=== Philanthropic activities ===
In 2011, he travelled to Haiti with the charity Christian Aid to document reconstruction work after the country's devastating earthquake one year before.

Between 2009 and 2014, Tillmans served as an Artist Trustee of the Tate Board. He is also a member of the museum's Collection Committee and the Tate Britain Council. In 2017, he was elected to the Council of the Institute of Contemporary Arts (ICA); in 2019, he was appointed the chair of the board. In this capacity, he organized an auction at Sotheby's in October 2022 to benefit the ICA, with contributions from Tacita Dean, Richard Prince and Anish Kapoor, among others.

=== Jury member ===
As part of the inaugural "Artist-to-Artist" initiative at Frieze London in 2023, Tillmans proposed Mark Barker for a solo exhibition at the fair. In 2024, he was a member of the jury that selected Simone Fattal as a recipient of the Akademie der Künste's Berlin Art Prize.

=== Political activities ===
In the lead-up to the 2016 referendum over whether Britain should leave the European Union, Tillmans devoted himself and the resources of his studio to a campaign to keep Britain in. In the lead-up to Germany's 2017 parliamentary elections, he produced posters against the far-right Alternative for Germany party. Ahead of the 2024 European elections, he donated 50,000 euros to the Social Democratic Party (SPD).

== Awards ==
- 1995: ars viva
- 2000: Turner Prize
- 2009: Culture Award, German Society for Photography
- 2013: Elected Academician, Royal Academy, London
- 2014: Charles Wollaston Award, the main prize of the Royal Academy Summer Exhibition, with a prize of £25,000
- 2015: Hasselblad Award, Hasselblad Foundation, Gothenburg, Sweden
- 2015: Royal Photographic Society Centenary Medal and Honorary Fellowship
- 2018: Order of Merit of the Federal Republic of Germany
- 2018: Nino Gennaro Award, Sicilia Queer filmfest
- 2023: Time 100

== Personal life ==
Tillmans lives between Berlin and London. He has owned a beach house in Fire Island Pines, New York since 2016.
