= Illiberal democracy =

A concept of a government system and a right-wing to far-right ideology

Donald Trump (right), Viktor Orbán (centre) and JD Vance during Orbán's visit to the White House in 2025. Orban and Trump are described as notable illiberal leaders; as the Prime Minister of Hungary, until 2026 Orban was heading a regime he called an illiberal democracy.

Illiberalism and illiberal democracy refer to a governing system that "hides its practices behind formally democratic institutions and procedures" and, more recently, to right-wing and far-right political movements and the ideology shared by them. These movements broadly seek to dismantle a liberal democratic system in favor of a nominally democratic one by relying on majoritarian nation-state principles and authoritarian practices. While there is no universal consensus on a precise definition, the terms broadly describe governments that present themselves as democracies while subtly suppressing opposing views, while the movements establishing them oppose pluralism, liberalism, and values associated with it in favor of national homogeneity. While the term originated among academic and critical circles, some illiberal politicians and leaders, such as the former ruler of Hungary Viktor Orbán, have identified the term with themselves, their movements, and their systems.

Illiberal rulers may disregard, circumvent, or undermine constitutional limits on their power. Whereas liberal democracies safeguard individual rights and freedoms, illiberal systems may fail to do so, or such rights may be significantly restricted or gradually eroded. Elections in an illiberal regime are often manipulated, rigged, or lopsided, whether overtly or subtly, legitimizing and consolidating the incumbent rather than genuinely choosing the country's leaders and policies. In terms of ideology, illiberalism rejects rational discourse, instead promoting intolerance, fear of difference, the cult of force, discipline, and moral authority and tends to concentrate power within the strong personalist leader figure and the ruling party, representing the "authentic" national community to be restored. Illiberal constitutions are generally anti-pluralist and anti-institutionalist. However, while illiberalism opposes political liberalism as a set of progressive ideas, it is tied to neoliberalism in economics, and in economic policies it implements a nationalist and authoritarian version of neoliberalism. Illiberalism as ideology has been described by some researchers as a 21st-century form of fascism, maintaining electoral systems while employing state power and mass mobilization for largely nationalist, anti-minority, and anti-freedom purposes along Counter-Enlightenment lines, often under the leaders or their close associates who are elevated or even given a personality cult. More nuanced assessments admit the similarities with fascism, but also note that illiberalism does not give a "wholesale return."

Illiberal democracy as a definition of a separate regime type originally presented by Fareed Zakaria remains a contested term in academia, with critics calling "illiberal democracy" an euphemism for election-based or hybrid authoritarian systems or defining illiberalism as, above all, an ideology. Scholars have challenged the view that illiberal democracies are genuine democracies, some contending that liberal principles and democracy are inseparable and that elections cannot be considered free and fair without freedom of the press and speech. Critics also contend that classifying illiberal democracy as democratic is overly sympathetic to such regimes, and therefore prefer terms such as electoral authoritarianism, competitive authoritarianism, or soft authoritarianism. The term illiberal in relation to movements and ideology is not universal as well, with the terms such as authoritarian populism being used instead. Other authors believe it adequate to classify them as fascist but operating in the mainstream and avoiding such self-identification; they see the term as downplaying the genealogy and ideological foundations of such movements.

== Origin and usage of the term ==
=== Antiquity to the 20th century ===
Elements of illiberalism date back to Plato's embrace of an illiberal social order, with democracy viewed as inferior to monarchy and aristocracy. Since antiquity, the terms liberal and illiberal lacked any connection with democracy and political government until the French Revolution, and were instead used to describe the noble or ignoble personal qualities of individuals. In the eighteenth century, liberal came to be viewed as character traits of an enlightened gentleman, associated with reasonableness, politeness, open-mindedness, and tolerance; whereas illiberal was described as being ungenerous, mean, narrow-minded, bigoted, and offensive. For example, Lord Chesterfield wrote: "Whenever you write Latin, remember that every word or phrase which you make use of, but cannot find in Caesar, Cicero, Livy, Horace, Virgil; and Ovid, is bad, illiberal Latin." By the 20th century, liberalism was primary viewed in a European context, eventually becoming Americanized and associated with liberal democracy. While totalitarian regimes during the 1930s and 1940s criticized liberalism, they did not embrace the label of "illiberal democracy," partly due to its prior negative connotations, although anti-totalitarian critics soon came to use the term.

=== Modern usage ===
The fall of the Berlin Wall in 1989 led to Francis Fukuyama's influential book The End of History and the Last Man, announcing that the last "beacon of illiberal forces" in the world had been extinguished and that Western-style liberalism was ascendant through Americanization, liberalization, and globalization. The modern term and concept of illiberal democracy derives from the 1995 book Towards Illiberal Democracy in Pacific Asia. Challenging Fukuyama's thesis that political history was culminating in the global rule of capitalist liberal democracy, the book countered that Pacific Asia was not converging on liberal democracy but had instead taken an illiberal turn. Political philosopher Daniel A. Bell contributed a chapter on Confucianism as offering an alternative, illiberal approach to democracy.

The term illiberal democracy was used and popularized by in a 1997 article in the journal Foreign Affairs. According to its author, illiberal democracies were "democratically elected regimes often re-elected or reinforced by referendums that ignored the constitutional limits of their power and deprived their citizens of basic rights and liberties." He stated that in the West, electoral democracy and civil liberties (of speech, religion, etc.) go hand in hand, but that around the world, the two concepts were coming apart. According to this observation, democracy without constitutional liberalism was producing centralized regimes, the erosion of liberty, ethnic competition, conflict, and war. Recent scholarship has addressed why elections, institutions commonly associated with liberalism and freedom, have led to such negative outcomes in illiberal democracies. Hybrid regimes are political systems in which the mechanism for determining access to state office combines both democratic and autocratic practices. In hybrid regimes, freedoms exist, and the opposition is allowed to legally compete in elections, but the system of checks and balances becomes inoperative.

By the decade after the Cold War, a rise in right-wing nationalist and populist parties began openly declaring themselves against liberal democracy. Beginning in Russia and Central and Eastern Europe, political scientists Ivan Krastev and Stephen Holmes described the emergence of an "illiberal counter-revolution". Viktor Orbán, the Prime Minister of Hungary, gave an often cited speech in 2014 where he proclaimed Hungary an illiberal democracy, stating that "a democracy does not necessarily have to be liberal" and that "the new state we are constructing in Hungary is an illiberal state, a non-liberal state." Modern advocates of illiberal democracy insist they are more democratic than others, and generally define themselves as being against liberal democracy, the West, and the United States. Vladimir Putin of Russia is an outspoken critic of liberalism, with him and Orban described as redefining it in ways that suit their agendas by equating it with multiculturalism, immigration, and LGBTQ rights. The election of Donald Trump saw a large increase in scholarly research about illiberalism, what it means, and heavy debates on whether or not America is on the road to fascism.

== Definition ==
=== Illiberal democracies as a definition of governments ===
There have been various opinions in literature on whether 'illiberal democracy' constitutes a separate government system and whether such regimes can be called democracies. Scholars have generally criticized the claim that illiberal democracies are democracies, arguing that liberal principles and democracy cannot be separated and that without freedom of the press and speech, elections cannot truly be free and fair. According to jurist András Sajó, illiberal democracy should be counted as a type of democracy because it is "democratic in a plebiscitarian sense". Other theorists say that classifying illiberal democracy as democratic is overly sympathetic to the illiberal regimes, that the term itself is an euphemism for election-based authoritarian systems, and therefore prefer terms such as electoral authoritarianism, competitive authoritarianism, or soft authoritarianism.

There is a spectrum of illiberal democracies: from those that are nearly liberal democracies to those that are almost openly dictatorships. One method of determining whether a regime is an illiberal democracy proposed in 2002 is to determine whether "it has regular, free, fair, and competitive elections to fill the principal positions of power in the country, but it does not qualify as Free in Freedom House's annual ratings of civil liberties and political rights." A 2008 article by Rocha Menocal, Fritz and Rakner describes the emergence of illiberal democracies and discusses some of their shared characteristics. Rocha Menocal, Fritz, and Rakner try to draw the similarity between illiberal democracies and hybrid regimes. The authors make the case that the "democratic optimism" in the 1990s—following the collapse of the Soviet Union—has led to the emergence of hybrid regimes holding illiberal values. Initially, the Western powers assumed that democratic consolidation would occur automatically and disregarded the alternatives. In reality, the non-consolidation of democracy has led to the rise of hybrid regimes that possess "illiberal values".

Regime type is important for illiberal democracies. This is because illiberal democracies can rise from both consolidated liberal democracies and authoritarian states. Zakaria, the author of the term, initially wrote his paper using the term illiberal democracy interchangeably with pseudo-autocracies but today they are used to describe countries that are potentially democratically backsliding as well.

In order to discourage this problem and promote the development of liberal democracies with free and fair elections, Zakaria proposes that the international community and the United States must promote gradual liberalization of societies. Zakaria advances institutions like the World Trade Organization, the Federal Reserve System, and a check on power in the form of the judiciary, to promote democracy and limit the power of the people, which can be destructive. Illiberal democratic governments may believe they have a mandate to act in any way they see fit as long as they hold regular elections. Lack of liberties, such as freedom of speech and freedom of assembly, makes opposition extremely difficult. The rulers may centralize power between the branches of the central government and the local government (exhibiting no separation of powers). Media are often controlled by the state and strongly support the regime. Non-governmental organizations may face onerous regulations or simply be prohibited. The regime may use red tape, economic pressure, imprisonment or violence against its critics. Zakaria believes that constitutional liberalism can bring democracy, but not vice versa.

Author Jennifer Gandhi says that many autocrats allow elections in their governance to stabilize and reinforce their regimes. She first says that elections help leaders resolve threats from elites and from the masses by appeasing those capable of usurping power with money and securing the cooperation of the general public with political concessions. Gandhi also claims that illiberal elections serve other useful purposes, such as providing autocrats with information about their citizens and establishing legitimacy both domestically and in the international community, and that these varied functions must be elucidated in future research. One example of the regime durability provided by illiberal democracy is illustrated in Mubarak's Egyptian regime. Lisa Blaydes shows that under Mubarak's lengthy rule, elections provided a mechanism through which elites bought votes to support the government (through distributing needed goods and resources to the public) to acquire regime-enforced parliamentary immunity. This enabled them to accumulate illicit wealth and draw from state resources without legal consequence. Such research suggests that, given the stability-providing function of illiberal elections, states governed under illiberal democracies may have low prospects for a transition to a democratic system protected by constitutional liberties.

=== Illiberalism as an ideology ===
Recently (mostly after 2020), however, as Marlène Laruelle notes, researchers have shifted from "illiberal" as an adjective for governments differing from what is understood as liberal, as in the term 'illiberal democracy', to employing a term illiberalism, as a definition of certain movements underpinned by an ideology, and to practices associated with certain ideological content. Such ussage of illberalism indicates an opposition to liberalism or liberal democracy. Fritz Stern, a historian of Germany, in 1992 understood illiberalism as an anti-democratic mentality, and anti-democratic practices such as suffrage restrictions. Hungarian author Zsolt Enyedi defined illiberalism as opposition to the main principles of liberal democracy: limited government, open society, and state neutrality, distinguishing between authoritarian, populist, traditionalist, religious, paternalist, libertarian, nativist-nationalist, materialist, and left-wing varieties. Kauth and King in 2020 made a further emphasis on "ideological illiberalism", a major principle of which is exclusion of some groups from the citizenry. Some authors also included deprivatization of religion and development of a corresponding judicial system, like in Russia under Vladimir Putin.

Viktor Orban, the leader of Hungary until 2026 and of the illiberal party Fidesz and the movement called Orbanism, in 2014 claimed the term for himself. He set an agenda of building an "illiberal state" proposed by his advisor Gyula Tellér. In his speech, he connected liberalism with individualism, moral nihilism, global capitalism, multiculturalism and denial of the "duties to the national community and the state" - and opposed them to the illiberal project, an answer to liberal elites disconnected from the "real" nation. Illiberalism thus would be a "work-based" society where "work determines the worth of the individual" and which is subordinated to the will of the alleged national majority and conservative values. Laurelle notes that Orban's concept here is close to the one of "sovereign democracy" set by Vladislav Surkov, a major ideologue of Putinism in Russia, though he and Vladimir Putin's other officials never used the term "illiberalism".

Laruelle defines illiberalism as its own "ideological universe" which is its nature fluid and context-based, but has coherent core principles, which are backlash against modern liberalism in favour of "majoritarian, nation-centric or sovereigntist" system based on "traditional hierarchies and cultural homogeneity", calling for "a shift from politics to culture and is post-post-modern in its claims of rootedness in an age of globalization". They "explicitly identify liberalism as their enemy" and "denounce, in varying proportions, the political, economic, and cultural liberalism embodied in supranational institutions, globalization, multiculturalism, and minority-rights protections." She writes that it's fluid and exists in postmodernity, but rejects cosmopolitainism associated with postmodernism and attempts to return to the nation-state as an earlier core value. Not all opposition to liberalism is illiberal: according to her, it's a post-liberal stance sceptical of liberalism "as it exists today in practice" and is well illustrated by Putin's statement that liberalism has become "obsolete." Illiberalism, according to her, shares values and principles with conservatism: the belief that there are ontological features that cannot be challenged or denied in the name of individual will, that identity cannot be changed by individual choice, that morality, authority, conformity, and hierarchy to some extents are needed, while "progress" and "emancipation" subvert them and risk at bringing "chaos" and "decadence". However, according to Laruelle, there are "significant differences between illiberalism and conservatism" as it has been "traditionally understood".

The key element that dissociates illiberalism from conservatism is its relationship to political liberalism. Classical conservatives – such as the Christian Democrats in Europe or the Republican Party in the U.S. before Donald Trump – are/were fervent supporters of political rights and constitutionalism, while illiberalism challenges them. For classical conservatives, the political order is a reflection of the natural and family order, and therefore commands some submission to it. For illiberals, today’s political order is the enemy of the natural order and should be fought against. Illiberalism thus includes a rebellious aspect that is not obvious for classical conservatism. Yet that distinction is far from absolute: historically, some movements that have emerged from conservatism have taken a revolutionary turn, fascism being probably the most obvious example.

The prominent examples of illiberalism named by Laurelle are Orbanism, Trumpism in the U.S., the Law and Justice party in Poland and the later Putinism in Russia - with the latter, according to her, standing out by not being populist.

Similarly, Ruzha Smilova, one of the authors of The Routledge Handbook of Illiberalism, also writes about illiberalism as an ideology, that the regimes termed illiberal democracies share an ideological component at their cores. Generally she defines illiberalism with the following principles:

1. Unrestrained popular sovereignty: neither in foreign nor in domestic politics, neither externally nor internally, can liberal values and norms - such as international human rights law... - limit the general will, the ultimate source of political power.
2. Ethno-nationalist "common good" anti-individualism and anti-pluralism: the ethno-national community (organized in an ethnically defined homogeneous nation-state), with its shared identity, common interests, and collective duties, enjoys strict priority over individuals with their interests, rights, and choices.
3. Anti-liberal anti-globalism: prosperity of the nation-state may require: (a) aggressive protectionism of the national economy rather than free competition in the open global markets; and (b) (ethnicized) redistribution aimed at social cohesion."

She writes that these are met with differing consistency: all three are found in Orbanism, while Trumpism does not pose as anti-individualist, and Poland did not proceed with economic protectionism. She names other major components of illiberalism which she without an explanation calls "adjacent" to the core, though she notes that they are exhibited by illiberalism globally and András Sajó, for example, calls personalism/Caesarism the central feature of illiberalism. These are:

1. Victimization of the nation by perceived injustices and humiliations, recent or historic, which need to be redressed to restore "self-respect" and the "lost authenticity" via "national pride";
2. Concentration of power under the image of a strong personalist or Caesarist leader representing the "lost authentic [national] community" - by the leader, the ruling party and the unconstrained executive and extension of authority through force legitimized by a popular plebiscite. Smilova believes it to be stemming out of "unrestrained popular sovereignty";
3. Absolute priority of "national interests" over international norms, "strong assertion of national sovereignty" against "externally imposed change";
4. Paternalistic state promoting 'traditional' values and communitarian policies at the expense of individual choice;
5. Nationalist anti-pluralism seeking to create a homogenous nation, with the perceived 'others' excluded from the community;
6. Spread of misinformation and "war" on political correctness in the name of pluralism or "free speech".

Laruelle writes the illiberalism is directed against both cultural liberalism and economic neoliberalism which it sees as tied together in Central and Eastern Europe, but admits that it "reduc[es] the number of groups that can receive state public support while increasing the number of those left alone in the face of harsh neoliberal reforms", while "illiberal leaders often have an affairist dimension and networks in the business world". Scholars have noted that despite its vehement opposition to political liberalism as to set of global and progressive political ideas, is a product of neoliberal economics, and to large extent illiberalism aligns with it. Giroux presented Trump as a core figure of the era of "unbrindled neoliberalism" which prepared the grounds for such movements as Trumpism and Bolsonarism through atomization and reduction of education. By Hendrikse of The Oxford Handbook of Illiberalism, neoliberalism which has leaned towards the right and conservatism was initially defined by illiberal tendencies and scepticism to democracy, the latter favoured to private property and economic totalization; it led largely to privatization of politics and global erosion of democracy and social institutions, especially to authoritarianism and neocolonial tendencies outside the Western core. As Hendrikse writes, undemocratic tendencies of neoliberalized capitalism are accelerated by the "other" to political liberalism - illiberalism, which in practice, while targeting democratic public institutions, has "doubled down" on neoliberal economy and does not go against private institutions. He notes that illiberal movements have typically grown as increasingly radicalized center-right parties which discarded centrism and allied with the far-right - like the US Republicans. Gallo writes in relation to the movements which he refers to as 'illiberal' but then prefers to call nationalist populist, that they gave expectation that they would dismantle the neoliberal order seemingly opposite to their nationalism. However, in power they proceeded with a nationalist version of neoliberalism which he calls "neoliberalism in one country": the state went to strengthen the position of fractions of national capitalists while itself becoming "the key neoliberal player" and an aggressive "provider of pro-business policies" at the expense of the poorer layers and classes. Such is exhibited from the U.S. to semi-peripheral Europe and developing economies like Turkey, Indonesia, and India. In Orban's paradigmatic case, xenophobic nationalism matched with promoting the national capitalists, but also flat taxes, subsidies to national and international companies, welfare reduction and FDI promotion in foreign-dominated sectors. Overall, their nationalist neoliberalism may be called a "compromise between national and transnational capital" and technochratic and political elites.

==== Relation to fascism ====
Given what is written above and the term becoming applied to a relatively specific ideological set, some authors started comparing these movements and their regimes to fascism. Such researchers as Kennedy assessed it as a 21st-century form of fascism which maintains electoral systems while employing state power for largely nationalist, anti-minority, and anti-freedom purposes, often under the leadership of dominant figures and their close associates. Such scholars Ruth Ben-Ghiat believe the movements called above illiberal, like Orban's self-defined illiberal democracy and Trumpism, as examples of contemporary fascism. Some authors even reject the term illiberalism, framing the movements called so as "covert fascists".

Hendrikse (The Oxford Handbook of Illiberalism) here notes the similarities of fascism and illiberalism, and evokes the term post-fascism by Gáspár Miklós Tamás - and Fintan O'Toole's "pre-fascism" as a recent response to Tamás. Hendrikse writes that illiberalism as "(pre-)fascism" does not give a "wholesale return" to the interwar fascism, citing Hannah Arendt's notion of the radicalizing "alliance of capital and the mob" as a similarity, but also noting that illiberalism "works through digitally networked rather than mass movements" (citing Weigel) and exists in the conteporary digitalized space of "hyper politics". The term post-fascism is used for these movements by the historian Enzo Traverso. According to Traverso, 'unlike classical fascism, post-fascism operates within democratic frameworks while advancing nationalism, xenophobia, and illiberalism.' Similarly to Herndrikse, he notes that they are "simultaneously similar to and different from classical fascism of the twentieth century": cases like Putinism and Bolsonarism are similar in mobilization around "nationalism, authoritarianism, and a specific idea of “national regeneration”", but different in lacking the "utopian" dimension of fascism shaped by the industrial age and revolutionary communism and grow on neoliberal capitalism, presenting a conservative reaction to liberalism. Ben-Ghiat also writes "Fascism could now become "post-Fascism," as Fini called it."

Cesar Zanin believes that terms like "'right-wing populism', 'conservatism', or 'illiberal democracy' remain insufficient: they register deviation from liberal-democratic norms but under-specify positive ideological content, counter-semantics, political theology, and coercive orientation." About the term illiberalism he writes that it "fram[es] such politics as novel" and "obscur[es] links to older anti-egalitarian traditions." According to him, it downplays the dimension of projects like Trumpism and Bolsonarism as Counter-Enlightenment "political religions": they exhibit elements like "sacralised leadership, instrumentalisation of religious faith in fundamentalist form, and the construction of a unified supremacist collective." This is where these movements resemble fascism, though they corrode liberal institutions instead of building a totalitarian regime. Fascism, he writes, was "a radical twentieth-century synthesis of Counter-Enlightenment values, beliefs, and practices under modern conditions"; today "political religion mechanisms are recombined under contemporary post-fascist, post-modern, hyper-mediatized, and digital conditions", and "variants" of radical fascist currents are blended "with adapted fascist and neo-fascist elements alongside broader conservatism."

Lotem Halevy and Lenka Buštíková write that what they term as 'confessional illiberalism' has profound similarities to the interwar fascism, and that the former draws inspiration from the latter; however, the main point where they depart is violence, since fascism was ready to use mass-scale terrorism against its populace against 'confessional illiberalism' unlike Fidesz; and in revolutionary character, since here illiberals are less radical, though they also seek a national rejuvenation and a new social contract. Among their examples they write that "Finally, illiberalism and populism, unlike fascism, do not worship war for national expansion but might selectively weaponize militant groups against target groups (they do not include Putinism in their discussions of illiberalism).

Maheshwari and Jain deny evaluation of illiberalism as a form of fascism and oppose the two, writing that fascism has installed totalitarian regimes of intense state terrorism and propaganda and abolished democratic institutions "entirely", while illiberalism continues to hold elections and relies on "the pluralism that illiberal democracies claim to uphold, even if only superficially."

As Laurelle writes, movements called illiberal feature at least certain borrowings from the far-right, though their audiences are often different, and some authors stressed that since illiberalism becomes mainstream, the term "far-right" no longer applies to the principles illiberal movements stand for, and so the term should be reserved for the more radical and fringe groups. Varga and Buzogány wrote that illiberal movements are blend of "revolutionary conservatives", like the "New Right" or seeking to rehabilitate the 'Conservative Revolution', and "national conservatives" who are less radical.

=== Relationship with populism ===
With the different types and different examples of illustrations discussed, a key component in the rise of illiberal democracies today is populism. Current populist leaders—especially within Western states—have the tendency to promote illiberal values, a notable example being the exclusion of immigrants and openly xenophobic statements. This wave has been labeled as "xenophobic populism".

Authors Cas Mudde and Cristóbal Rovira Kaltwasser discuss the role of populism in deteriorating liberal democracies. In the article, Mudde and Kaltwasser argue that populism—although it is often associated with negative connotations—is democratic in nature, as it gives voice to the people and strongly upholds the principle of majoritarian rule. The problem arises within liberal democracies, as the authors say that liberal values and democracy internally contradict each other. Democracy promises majoritarian rule while liberal values promise the protection of minorities. Furthermore, it is said that populism is a product of democracy, but in general, populist leaders try to use the democratic aspect of liberal democracies to undermine liberalism. This is closely related to Zakaria's argument. The authors try to establish the idea that the rise of populism is undermining liberal values, as populism at its core rejects plurality and minority protection, often the evident liberal values.

Moreover, Sheri Berman supports the idea that democracy being unchecked by liberalism can lead to populist—and in some regards dangerous—rule, but further says that liberal values unchecked by democracy can be just as dangerous, as she says, through the use of historical examples, this can lead to oligarchic rule. Berman takes a different perspective on the role of populism, arguing that the weakening of democratic institutions, rather than populism itself, has led to its rise and the deterioration of liberal democracies. When discussing this matter, Berman through the example of Western states—United States and Europe—has attributed the cause of populist backlash to national government disregarding the interests of average citizens for business elites. In sum, Berman is trying to demonstrate that populism has led to the rise of illiberal democracies, while populism has gained traction as a result of democratic institutions being too elite-led.

While populism is closely associated with the rise of illiberal democracy, religious fundamentalism, radical nationalism, and communitarianism are also common paths.

== Cases of illiberalism ==
The following European regimes have been described as cases of illiberalism or "competitive authoritarianism".

State	Time period	Leader	Notes	Source
FR Yugoslavia	1987–2000	Slobodan Milošević		
Bosnia and Herzegovina	1990–1996	Alija Izetbegović		
Croatia	1991–1999	Franjo Tuđman	Tuđmanism	
Belarus	1994–1996	Alexander Lukashenko	From 1996 on considered authoritarian or dictatorship	
Ukraine	1991–2004	Leonid Kravchuk Leonid Kuchma		
Romania	1992–1995	Ion Iliescu		
Russia	1993–1999	Boris Yeltsin		
Slovakia	1993, 1996–1997	Vladimír Mečiar	Democracy of the Carpathian type	
Russia	2000–2012	Vladimir Putin Dmitry Medvedev	Putinism Since re-election of Putin 2012 considered autocratic	
Turkey	2007–2017	Recep Tayyip Erdoğan	Since constitutional amendments in 2017 considered autocratic	
FYR Macedonia	2007–2016	Nikola Gruevski		
Ukraine	2010–2014	Viktor Yanukovych		
Hungary	2010–2026	Viktor Orbán	Orbanism	
Albania	2013–present	Edi Rama		
Serbia	2014–2026	Aleksandar Vučić		
Poland	2015–2023	Andrzej Duda	Polish rule-of-law crisis since 2015	
Slovakia	2023–present	Robert Fico		

=== Hungary ===
In a 2014 speech, after winning re-election for the first time, Viktor Orbán, Prime Minister of Hungary described his views about the future of Hungary as an "illiberal state". In his interpretation the "illiberal state" does not reject the values of the liberal democracy, rather modern social liberalism, calling it corrupt and unfair and states that the country should work as a community. Orbán listed Singapore, Russia, Turkey, and China as examples of economically "successful" nations, "none of which is liberal and some of which aren’t even democracies."

=== Serbia ===
Laruelle lists "Putin's Russia, Vučić's Serbia, or Orbán's Hungary" as "countries with an established illiberal regime." Václav Štětka an Sabina Mihelj place the Serbian Progressive Party (SNS), the ruling party of Serbia until 2026, and its leader Aleksandar Vučić "at the forefront of Serbia's illiberal turn to this day" and write that while Orbán, Jarosław Kaczyński and Vučić used populism as a vehicle for mobilization, all share a "commitment to ethno-nationalism, disdain for cultural liberalism, and a propensity for adopting majoritarian solutions and undermining key democratic institutions, such as the judiciary and independent media." According to them, Vučić and the SNS represented the illiberal public sphere which lost political power after the overthrow of Slobodan Milosevic in 2000, but remained strong due to the lack of democratic consolidation; after coming to power, Vučić used the economic and state pressure on media and legislation which was "nominally aimed at increasing media independence" to reestablish the illiberal cultural hegemony - though they noted that the Serbian state media adopts a "more moderate tone" compared to commercial outlets, unlike in Hungary or Poland, where the state media was the center element of promoting illiberalism. Vučić's attitude to progressivism is illustrated by his participation in the Budapest Demographic Summit, a forum of illiberal speakers to promote the ideas "ultra-conservative values" and "a conviction that such values are under attack by 'liberal global elites' whose support for immigration, gender equality, and LGBTQ+ rights is seen as a threat to the conservative values of family, nation, and Western civilization." In a speech delivered there, Vučić complained about "liberal political Marxism" allegedly taking prominence in Serbia. On the other hand, the policies of the SNS were influenced by its nominally pro-European course: the SNS allowed the refugees during the initial phase of the refugee crisis, but then promoted anti-immigration agenda after it gained strength in Europe. The topic of LGBTQ rights had been instrumentalized by the SNS to show their support of Europeiniazation, so Vučić made limited gestures in support of the LGBTQ, like appointing Ana Brnabić, while keeping homophobia in the cultural hegemony in practice.

=== Slovakia ===
In 1995 Slovak journalists coined the term "Democracy of the Carpathian type" to describe the illiberal democracy of Vladimír Mečiar's government in the 1990s. Today, the term is often used in connection with the policies of Robert Fico's government, which has been criticised for censorship of criticism of government politicians in media, abolition of the special prosecutor's office, politically motivated abolition of the Radio and Television of Slovakia by Slovak Television and Radio, unjustified exchanges in various expert positions, the cover-up of the accident of government politician Andrej Danko, etc. The previous cabinet of Robert Fico was accused of organised corruption and some politicians were directly or indirectly linked to the kidnapping of Vietnamese businessman Trịnh Xuân Thanh and to the assassination of investigative journalist Ján Kuciak and his fiancée.

=== India ===
Indian-American journalist Fareed Zakaria claimed that India was the largest illiberal democracy in the world, in his book The Future of Freedom: Illiberal Democracy at Home and Abroad.

=== Israel ===
The scholar Guy Ziv calls Benjamin Netanyahu's judicial reform aimed at weakening the Israeli justice system as a "playbook" strategy of illiberal leaders like Orban. Other than to attempts to reduce the independence of power of the Supreme Court, Netanyahu's officials and loyalists have set bills aimed at excluding possible opponents from society, such as the one targeting NGOs as "foreign agents" and the ones criminalizing calling for boycotting as property damage and banning supporters of Boycott, Divestment and Sanctions from visiting Israel or the Palestinian Territories. Other that the rule of Netanyahu and Likud, who are bound to Orban and Trump with prominent ideological and strategic ties, Suzanne Schneider believes that the whole system of the State of Israel which mixes formal electoral procedures with a lack of formal constitution and ethnic particularism and discrimination in rights and property relations, may be called an illiberal democracy - corresponding to the ideals of leaders Orban and Trump. The denial of constitutionalism and liberal universalism she illustrates with the quote of David Ben-Gurion, the founding leader of Israel who opposed introducing a constitution: "I choose to be under the rule of bad Jews rather than under the good rule of refined non-Jews in a popular democracy or another kind of democracy." The attitude towards Israel abroad is illustrated by Yoram Hazony, the leader of the American Edmund Burke Foundation, who believes that Israel is a democracy unrestrained by the universalist "one 'politically correct' constitution" "of Rousseau and Kant", which is "permitted by a certain strand of radical Western political thought." Attempts to overturn it were taken by judges like Aharon Barak, what Hazony calls "constitutional revolution" against the "traditional concept of Israel": Barak attempted to set the judicial system on the principle of equality of all citizens, and in response the Israeli right have portrayed the court as an enemy institution. Thus, Schneider writes, Netanyahu's struggle against the judiciary is not "a Hungarian import", but "the culmination of this decades-long struggle against Israel's stillborn liberal democracy."

=== Turkey ===
In a 2015 CNN reportage, Zakaria said that Turkey under Recep Tayyip Erdoğan had become a textbook case of illiberal democracy. Erik Meyersson observed that using Freedom House’s measure of liberty, Turkey took the last place among electoral democracies in 2015, scoring worse on the liberty measure than some countries that are not even considered electoral democracies.

=== Philippines ===
Since 2016, the Philippines under presidents Rodrigo Duterte and Bongbong Marcos has been described as being in an illiberal democracy. It has been described as a worldwide capital and stronghold of illiberalism culturally and politically.

=== Russia ===
Putinist Russia has been called an example of an illiberal regime and Putin is framed as an illiberal leader by such scholars as Laruelle, who draws attention to him calling liberalism "obsolete", thus opposing it from a post-liberal perspective. Smilova cites Putin's personalism and the framing of him as exemplary for what she calls the personalist caesarist rule restoring the nation and unconstrained by institutions, shown by such leaders as Orban too. The academic historian Roger Griffin calls Putinism an example of 'illiberal democracy' to argue that Putin's regime is not fascist.

=== United States ===
In America, some academics have criticized American liberalism for not being liberal enough and living up to its professed values, with critics deriding this as "cancel culture" and a form of illiberalism. Other right-wing thinkers such as Patrick Deneen have openly criticized liberalism, instead arguing for replacing it with a new form of illiberal government. The Republican Party has in recent years faced criticism that it is becoming increasingly illiberal under the leadership of Donald Trump, who was elected president in 2016 and 2024. According to a 2020 study by the V-Dem Institute, the Republican Party has become more illiberal and populist in the last decade with a large increase under the leadership of Donald Trump. Trump's populist style of governance has been considered by some to be a dangerous risk to the heart of liberal democracy, as well as indifference towards traditional democratic allies and praising other "strongman rulers" in the world like Vladimir Putin.

=== South Korea ===
South Korea is often cited as a model case of successful democratization since 1987. According to indicators from Freedom House and the Electoral Integrity Project, it has established a procedurally sound and high-quality electoral democracy. However, many political scientists analyze that South Korea remains in a systematically 'defective' state, lacking core elements of constitutional liberalism such as the rule of law, civil liberties, and the separation of powers—particularly horizontal accountability. This 'deficit of liberalism' was highlighted in the V-Dem Institute’s 2024 Democracy Report, which classified South Korea as a country undergoing autocratization on a 'Bell-Turn' trajectory, with its democracy score peaking around 2018 and subsequently declining.

Scholars attribute this liberal deficit to both institutional and historical factors. Institutionally, the country's 'imperial presidency' is viewed as lacking horizontal accountability, while the winner-take-all electoral system is described by some analyses as reinforcing political polarization. Historically, it is argued by some scholars that the legacy of the Cold War and the anti-communist '1948 system' contributed to a political culture that often disregards liberal values such as freedom of speech and freedom of association, a tendency described as being observed across both conservative and progressive political camps. South Korea was ranked 62nd in the 2024 Press Freedom Index, and its ranking has stagnated in the World Bank’s Rule of Law indicator.

Within this structural context, scholars describe the Moon Jae-in administration (2017–2022) as a 'populist moment' that challenged liberal norms through 'fandom politics' and a weakening of institutional forbearance. Critics further argue that the subsequent Yoon Suk Yeol administration (2022–2025) has intensified democratic regression through a 'rule by law' approach—mobilizing state institutions such as the prosecution and police against critical media outlets including KBS, MBC, and JTBC.

== Criticism ==
Writers such as Steven Levitsky and Lucan Way reject the concept of an illiberal democracy, saying it only "muddies the waters" on the basis that if a country does not have opposition parties and an independent media, it is not democratic. They say that terms like "illiberal democracy" are inappropriate for some of these states because the term implies that these regimes are at their heart democracies that have gone wrong. Levitsky and Way say that states such as the Federal Republic of Yugoslavia under Slobodan Milošević, Zimbabwe and post-Soviet Russia were never truly democratic and not developing toward democracy, but were rather tending toward authoritarian behavior despite having elections, which were sometimes sharply contested. Thus, Levitsky and Way coined a new term to remove the positive connotation of democracy from these states and distinguish them from flawed or developing democracies: competitive authoritarianism. However, the term competitive authoritarianism has been criticized for blurring the line between genuine and rigged elections and equating countries that actually operated as competitive and pluralistic systems (e.g. Hungary under Viktor Orbán or Turkey under Erdogan) with countries that retained the appearance of democracy but treated it as a fully fictional theatre (e.g. Belarus under Lukashenko)

According to Wojciech Sadurski, "illiberal democracy is largely an oxymoron" in Poland under Prawo i Sprawiedliwość, because "[b]y dismantling various checks and balances, and the many democratic institutions related to elections and judicial review, the ruling party greatly weakens the democratic character of the state". Sadurski prefers the term "plebiscitarian authoritarianism".

In 1998, author Marc Plattner said that democracy and liberalism have a turbulent relationship, where throughout history they constantly repel and attract one another. Plattner believes that the rise of illiberal democracies is merely part of a democratization cycle, where states democratizing will often shift from liberal to illiberal tendencies. From this, Plattner believes that through the careful assistance of consolidated democracies these 'illiberal democracies' can slowly push themselves out of this cycle.

According to a study by George Washington University political scientist Michael K. Miller, multiparty autocratic elections predict significantly better outcomes on health, education, gender equality, and basic freedoms relative to non-electoral autocracy. Effects on health and education are as strong as those of democracy and are significantly better than in non-electoral autocracy.

== See also ==
- Anocracy – Regime combining autocratic and democratic features
- Authoritarian capitalism – Economic system in which a market economy exists alongside an authoritarian government
- Authoritarian socialism – Socialist economic-political system
- Authoritarianism – Political system
- Corporatocracy – Society controlled by business corporations
- Democratic backsliding – Drift towards authoritarianism
- Democracy indices – Overview of democracy indicators
- Democracy of the Carpathian type – Pejorative term in Slovak journalism
- Defective democracy – Type of political system
- Dictablanda – Dictatorship in which civil liberties are allegedly preserved
- Dominant-party system – Continuous dominance of a single political party in elections
- Guided democracy – Democratic governments acting as autocracies
- Herrenvolk democracy – Form of government in which only one ethnic group can vote
- Hybrid regime – Regime combining autocratic and democratic features
- Inverted totalitarianism – Political theory about illiberal democracies
- Liberal autocracy – Form of non-democratic government
- Median voter theorem – Theorem in political science
- Neo-nationalism – Type of nationalism that rose in the mid-2010s
- Political corruption – Use of power by government officials for illegitimate private gain
- Polyarchy – Political rule by multiple people
- Post-fascism – Ideological shift from fascism to more mainstream conservatism
- Representative democracy – Type of democracy principled on elected representation
- Ruscism – Term describing Russian political ideology
- Semi-authoritarian – Regime combining autocratic and democratic features
- Soft despotism – Political regime
- State within a state – Covert government networks
- Totalitarian democracy – Dictatorship based on the mass enthusiasm generated by a perfectionist ideology

== Bibliography ==
=== Books ===
- Gallo, Ernesto (2025). The Era of Authoritarian Neoliberalism: The Rise of Technocrats, Nationalists and Autocrats. Brill. ISBN 9789004523630.
- Jones, David Martin; Jayasuriya, Kanishka; Brown, David; Bell, Daniel A. (1995). Towards Illiberal Democracy. doi:10.1057/9780230376410. ISBN 978-0-230-37641-0.
- Kennedy, Kerry J, ed. (2021). "Is Democracy 'Dead'?". Civic Engagement in Changing Contexts. SpringerBriefs in Education. SpringerBriefs in Education. Singapore: Springer Publishing. pp. 57–68. doi:10.1007/978-981-16-7495-2_5. ISBN 978-981-16-7494-5.
- Laruelle, Marlene, ed. (2024). The Oxford Handbook of Illiberalism. Oxford University Press. ISBN 9780197639108.
- Mounk, Yascha (18 March 2020). The People Vs. Democracy - Why Our Freedom Is in Danger and How to Save It. Harvard University Press. ISBN 978-0-674-24502-0.
- Muis, Arne; van Troost, Lars, eds. (2018). Will human rights survive illiberal democracy?. Amnesty International Netherlands. ISBN 978-90-6463-414-7. OCLC 1041192078.
- Puddington, Arch (2017). Breaking Down Democracy: Goals, Strategies, and Methods of Modern Authoritarians (PDF). OCLC 989162097.
- Sajó, András; Uitz, Renáta; Holmes, Stephen, eds. (2021). Routledge Handbook of Illiberalism (1 ed.). Routledge. doi:10.4324/9780367260569. ISBN 978-1-000-47945-4.
- Schedler, Andreas (2006). Electoral Authoritarianism: The Dynamics of Unfree Competition. Lynne Rienner Publishers. ISBN 978-1-58826-415-2.

=== Journal articles ===
- Bonet, Lluis; Zamorano, Mariano Martín (2021). "Cultural policies in illiberal democracies: a conceptual framework based on the Polish and Hungarian governing experiences". International Journal of Cultural Policy. 27 (5): 559–573. doi:10.1080/10286632.2020.1806829. S2CID 225285163.
- Diamond, Larry (April 2002). "Assessing the Quality of Democracy". Journal of Democracy. 13 (2): 51–65.
- Christie, Kenneth (1998). "Illiberal Democracy, Modernisation and Southeast Asia". Theoria: A Journal of Social and Political Theory (91): 102–118. ISSN 0040-5817. JSTOR 41802094.
- DeVotta, Neil (2010). "From civil war to soft authoritarianism: Sri Lanka in comparative perspective". Global Change, Peace & Security. 22 (3): 331–343. doi:10.1080/14781158.2010.510268. S2CID 143630796.

Laruelle, Marlene (2022). "Illiberalism: A conceptual introduction". East European Politics. 38 (2): 303–327. doi:10.1080/21599165.2022.2037079. hdl:11385/259401. S2CID 247210327.

- Nyyssönen, Heino; Metsälä, Jussi (24 September 2020). "Liberal Democracy and its Current Illiberal Critique: The Emperor's New Clothes?". Europe-Asia Studies. 73 (2): 273–290. doi:10.1080/09668136.2020.1815654. "Thus, there is a real danger of 'pseudo-democracy', especially because elections can be manipulated and often are. In these cases, elections and other democratic institutions are simply adapted patterns of authoritarianism, not democracy in some imperfect form, having the dual purpose of legitimising the incumbent's rule and guarding it from any danger of democratic change."
- Plattner, Marc F. (January 2019). "Illiberal Democracy and the Struggle on the Right". Journal of Democracy. 30 (1): 5–19. doi:10.1353/jod.2019.0000.
- Self, Darin (26 September 2022). "Illiberal Democracies and Democratic Backsliding". Oxford Bibliographies Online. doi:10.1093/obo/9780199756223-0352. ISBN 978-0-19-975622-3.

=== News articles ===
- Zakaria, Fareed (November–December 1997). "The Rise of Illiberal Democracy". Foreign Affairs. Archived from the original on 15 October 2005.
