= Lutz Huelle =

German fashion designer

- Born: 1966 (age 59–60); Remscheid, Germany
- Education: Central Saint Martins
- Label: Lutz Huelle
- Awards: ANDAM Fashion Award (2000, 2002)
- Website: lutzhuelle.com

Lutz Huelle is a German fashion designer based in Paris.

== Early life and education ==
Lutz Huelle studied fashion at Central Saint Martins in London, enrolling in the early 1990s after spending two years in Hamburg following high school. He described London at that time as a place "on fire," filled with creativity, music, and self-expression, an atmosphere that significantly influenced his turn toward fashion:

"I became really interested in fashion and the way you could change through the way you dressed… I realised you could be anybody, anything."

At Central Saint Martins, Huelle began with a foundation year that included sculpture, painting, photography, and fashion, before progressing into the BA Fashion program. He graduated with first-class honours in 1995. During his studies, he interned at Maison Martin Margiela, which led to a full-time position at the house shortly after graduation.

His final-year collection gained early recognition when it was featured in the debut issue of Purple Fashion and photographed by Anders Edström, reflecting early interest in his structural and conceptual design approach.

Years later, Huelle returned to Central Saint Martins as a visiting tutor, contributing to the MA Fashion program and sharing insights drawn from both his independent practice and his experience at Margiela. In interviews, he expressed strong appreciation for the role CSM played in his creative development:

"CSM changed my life in so many ways. I feel huge gratitude to the place."

Elements from his graduation collection were later revisited and repurposed in the first collection for his namesake label, Lutz Huelle, launched in 2000.

After graduating from Central Saint Martins in London Huelle moved to Paris to work under Martin Margiela, where he was responsible for the label's Artisanal and Knitwear lines.

Reflecting on the experience, Huelle said that Margiela's process "was so close to what I liked. It was so much about reality. He was one of the first people at the time who dressed people who I could understand, who I could identify with." He added: "It was such a small company at the time. In the studio, there was Martin, there was Nina (Nina-Maria Nitsche), and there was another person, and then there was me, working on the collections. It was super small, super familiar and friendly."

Huelle spoke of Margiela's vision as one of generosity and sincerity, stating: "Martin found beauty in every smallest detail, and that made life so much more pleasant. His work was full of generosity, it was sincere, it was the exact opposite of cynicism." He also noted that Margiela's designs were not made for a specific body type or age, but "for a taste," adding that fashion "had to speak to everyone."

In a later interview, Huelle reflected, "For me, it spoke to people on a democratic level… taking an old pair of jeans and altering it slightly so that it looks amazing," a philosophy he attributed to his experience at Margiela.

== Career ==
In 2000, Huelle launched his eponymous brand with his partner David Ballu. Initially his work was primarily supported by the alternative fashion press, including Purple (magazine), but remained relatively unknown to the mainstream fashion industry. After more than a decade, his brand began receiving recognition from the wider fashion community.

The mid-2010s saw the rise of streetwear-as-luxury fashion, led by Demna's Vetements and Balenciaga, which popularized oversized hoodies, utility pieces, and deconstructed outerwear. Dan Thawley of The Business of Fashion remarked that Huelle's work had "probably never been so relevant as now," noting that the Vetements revolution sparked a revival of the "subversive street uniform" that Huelle had explored for over a decade.

Nicole Phelps of Vogue Runway noted in 2024 that Huelle is "Paris's most underrated designer," commending his ability to create "real clothes… with quite a lot in the way of creative aplomb." She added, "Huelle makes some of the coolest jackets and coats in fashion right now, even if few people outside the industry know his name."

Tim Blanks further observed in 2020 that Huelle's collections maintain "a remarkable dialogue between plain and fancy," highlighting a bomber-bodied coat from Fall/Winter 2020 as epitomizing "casual, skewed glamour."

In 2019, Huelle was appointed Artistic Director of Spanish Couture Brand Jesús del Pozo.

In June 2022, Huelle was appointed as a guest designer for French brand AZ Factory, a venture originally founded by Alber Elbaz and luxury group Richemont.

Miles Socha of Women's Wear Daily described Huelle's Pre‑Fall 2024 collection for the brand as "a zesty, yet approachable lineup of wardrobe builders with as much personality as practicality," applauding his take on "offhand couture" through pieces like floral raincoats, tuxedo tailoring, and crystal‑fronted denim.

Lily Templeton, writing for Women's Wear Daily on August 27, 2023, praised the AZ Factory Resort 2024 collection for its "mix of refinement and ease," highlighting sculptural tops, tuxedo-inspired vests, and foil‑detailed denim.

Godfrey Deeny of Fashion Network, reviewing the AZ Factory collaboration on March 29, 2023, observed that "it was about him respecting, and yet extending, the DNA of a house founded by the late great Alber Elbaz," describing Huelle's result as "a balanced cocktail of street style, delicacy with denim and sense of rock 'n' roll, married to the hipster grand couture of Elbaz."

Huelle has worked as consultant for other luxury brands including Max Mara and Brioni (brand).

== Design philosophy ==
Huelle has been described as "Fashion's Dadaist" for his use of "decontextualization", removing garments from their original context and recombining elements from couture, eveningwear, streetwear, sportswear, workwear and men's tailoring to create new forms that challenge traditional fashion codes. He rejects nostalgia in design, stating, "I am aware of the history of fashion, but… I don't care about the past. I prefer to look forward because life is ahead." His work frequently explores themes of hybrid identity, reflecting his belief that "we are not only one identity, we are so many different things," and that fashion should embody this multiplicity.

For Huelle, observation of everyday dress remains a critical influence: "Looking at how people dress … is still a huge inspiration. … It keeps my work grounded in reality."

This philosophy extends to his views on sustainability and the purpose of clothing. "If my clothes are not worn... it means that I have failed at my job… these are clothes to be worn, to be lived in". He links sustainability to practicality: "If nobody wears your clothes what's the point … The idea of wearability has always been central to my work."

Huelle has often described fashion as a living, adaptive language rather than a rigid aesthetic system. "It's interesting to me when [fashion] says something about us and the way we live," he stated, underscoring his focus on expression, change, and relevance over nostalgia.

Madame Figaro called him "the most spiritual son of Martin Margiela", though Huelle's work, noted for its emotional sincerity and intimacy, diverges from Margiela's conceptual theatricality.

== Teaching and academic career ==
In addition to his design work, Huelle has been active as a guest lecturer and visiting tutor. He has taught at Central Saint Martins in London, where he previously studied, working with both undergraduate and MA Fashion students under Louise Wilson. Huelle has also taught at the École de la Chambre Syndicale de la Couture Parisienne in Paris, sharing his industry experience with students of haute couture and garment construction. He has described the two institutions as offering different approaches to design education but emphasized his appreciation for both environments.

Since September 2021, Huelle has led the Department of Fashion, Jewellery & Accessory Design at Haute école d'art et de design Genève, the Geneva University of Art and Design.

Jean‑Pierre Greff, then director of HEAD–Genève, welcomed Huelle's arrival during the 2021 HEAD Fashion Show, describing him as "a strong and beautiful personality in the contemporary fashion industry" whose leadership would bring "decisive momentum for the years to come."

In his introductory address, Huelle stated that fashion education must place "issues relating to the environment, community, gender and race" at its center, emphasizing that these questions are essential to the future of the discipline.

Under his leadership, the programme has emphasized creative freedom, experimentation, and the development of a personal design identity. According to a recent interview, Huelle encourages students to "sharpen each student's point of view" and to remain "curious, aware of the world, and unafraid of complexity," rather than reproducing a fixed aesthetic. Alumna Matil Vanlint is reported to have described her experience as "the best year of my life… they really push you to find your own universe... I really struggled with self-confidence, and HEAD helped me so much… they're so supportive. I've never been in a school like this."

Huelle's tenure has coincided with increased visibility for HEAD graduate collections. The 2025 HEAD Fashion Show, presenting 23 bachelor's and 8 master's collections to nearly 3,000 spectators, was described by Schön! Magazine as "an increasingly important event for uncovering fashion's next generation of creatives" and "a sharp awakening on the importance of exploring our smaller, yet mighty, cities around the world."

== Collaborations and exhibitions ==
Huelle has collaborated with artist Alexandra Bircken and photographer Wolfgang Tillmans, friends since meeting as teenagers in Remscheid, Germany and later living together in London in the early 1990s. Their creative and personal bond has had a lasting influence on each of their practices. In an interview, Bircken recalled: "We discovered freedoms together. Especially with Lutz, who is a man but physically very similar to me… we mixed it up and experimented" with clothing, gender and identity.

Huelle reflected on their shared values: "When we first became friends ... we shared a different idea of identity and the body... and it's evident in Wolfgang's work. It's always been the quest for identity, somehow."

Tillmans, who photographed both friends for i‑D magazine in the early 1990s- including the well-known image "Lutz & Alex sitting in the trees" (1992)- described his intention: "I wanted to portray two people at ease with their bodies… not portrayed as a clearly heterosexual couple… a more universal communication between human beings."

He also emphasized the political aspect of their shared subcultural experiences: "I always ascribed incredible political importance to clubbing… clubbing took us back to our relationships to our bodies."

All three later contributed to the exhibition La pensée corps (Fondation Pernod Ricard, Paris, 15 November 2022 - 28 January 2023), curated by Claire Le Restif, which "brings together the work of Alexandra Bircken and Lutz Huelle" and includes photographic material by Tillmans, uniting hybrid garments, sculptural forms and images to explore identity, intimacy, permeability and vulnerability.

La pensée corps was an art–fashion exhibition held at the Fondation Pernod Ricard in Paris from 15 November 2022 to 28 January 2023. Curated by Claire Le Restif, it featured works by German sculptor Alexandra Bircken and fashion designer Lutz Huelle, accompanied by photographic documentation by Wolfgang Tillmans.

La pensée corps (translated as “Body Thought”) investigated the body as mutable, permeable, and shaped by gesture, vulnerability, and material transformation. It addressed themes of identity, intimacy, and embodiment through sculptural, sartorial, and photographic media.

Bircken’s practice focused on anatomical and industrial deconstruction, with works including dissected firearms, resin-cast placentas, and bronze objects like Lily, a bicycle saddle suggesting both masculine and feminine forms.

Huelle’s garments challenged fashion archetypes by hybridizing traditionally gendered silhouettes- such as bomber jackets fused with eveningwear or tailored denim combined with satin. His work examined fashion’s role in identity, protection, and exposure.

Tillmans contributed a series of photographs originally published in Pop Magazine between 2019 and 2020, documenting Huelle’s garments in intimate and expressive contexts.

According to Le Restif, the exhibition was conceived not as a juxtaposition of art and fashion, but as a cohesive inquiry into how bodies resist, inhabit, and reimagine cultural and formal boundaries.

The exhibition was positively reviewed in the French press. In Le Monde, Marie Godfrain described it as “a rare and successful fusion” between sculpture and garment, masculine and feminine.

Arts in the City praised the emotional and tactile resonance of the works, calling the experience “as poetic as it is unsettling.”

- Textile Art Revue* commended the exhibition’s material innovation and symbolic treatment of the "second skin" in both sculpture and fashion.

L’Officiel des Spectacles highlighted the clarity and accessibility of the curatorial design.

== Critical reception ==
Cathy Horyn of The Cut described his Spring/Summer 2025 show as “alive to chance and unspoiled,” reflecting an effortless tension between tradition and play.

Tiziana Cardini of Vogue (magazine) wrote about his Spring/Summer 2025 Collection: "Huelle also deserves recognition for presenting one of the most delightfully clever and inventive collections of the week, proving that, despite a limited budget, with good ideas, a skillful handling of the métier and a sense of humor, you can deliver a knockout show." She continued: "Huelle wears his remarkable creativity and skills with such levity, it feels almost ridiculously effortless”

Nicole Phelps of Vogue (magazine) noted his Fall/Winter 2024 collection for its balance of “real clothes” and fashion-forward sensibility. She also stated:

“It’s not an exaggeration to say he’s making some of the coolest jackets and coats in fashion right now. … Huelle’s splicing and dicing works because it’s subtle. A jean jacket inset with triangles of lace that gave a gentle hourglass shape to the waist retained its everyday jeans‑iness. Ditto an army green bomber inset with a red‑on‑black rose print.”

and also:

“Is Lutz Huelle Paris’s most underrated designer? Seeing him back on the runway after a four-year gap, the thought came to mind. The deconstructed vintage jeans Huelle rehabs into hybridized trousers were trending all over town this week. Designers must know a good idea when they see one. He makes the “real clothes” that everyone is talking about this season with not much in the way of resources but quite a lot in the way of creative aplomb, and he’s been doing so for years.”

Élisabeth Clauss of *Madame Figaro* described Huelle as:

“the most rational surrealist in contemporary fashion and, unquestionably, if one were needed, the most spiritual son of Martin Margiela, following his own path.”

Tim Blanks of The Business of Fashion called his Spring/Summer 2016 collection “a subtle masterwork of day-to-night dressing,” and later noted his “irresistible ongoing dialogue between plain and fancy.”

"It might be that simple and irresistible with Huelle: an ongoing dialogue between plain and fancy. A raw-hemmed denim skirt paired with a green duchesse blouse with dramatic bell sleeves? Quintessential. A jean skirt twisted sideways worn under an immaculately tailored jacket with gathered shoulders? Lutz at his most direct. Though the cotton poplin shirt dress came a close second. The soundtrack was a jukebox of his favourite songs: “You’re So Vain”, Iggy’s “Lust for Life”, Britney’s ”Toxic”, the Slits’ “Heard it Through the Grapevine”. You can look forward to hearing those songs forever. Now imagine feeling the same way about your clothes. Or don’t, because Lutz already did it for you."

== Awards ==
Huelle is a two-time winner of the ANDAM Fashion Award, a recognition that has supported numerous emerging designers in France.
