= Evening =

Period of the day

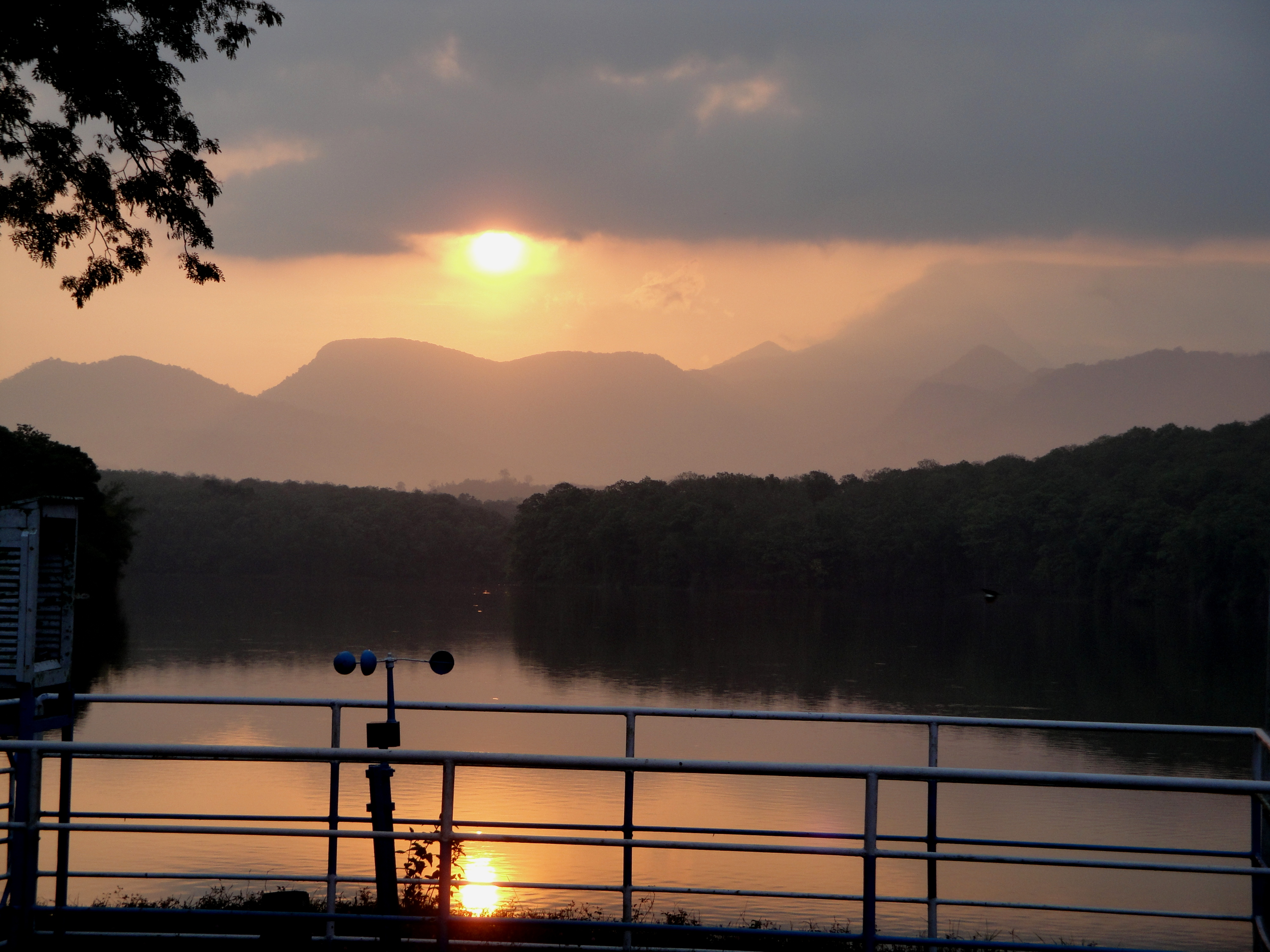
Evening in Parambikkulam, Kerala, India

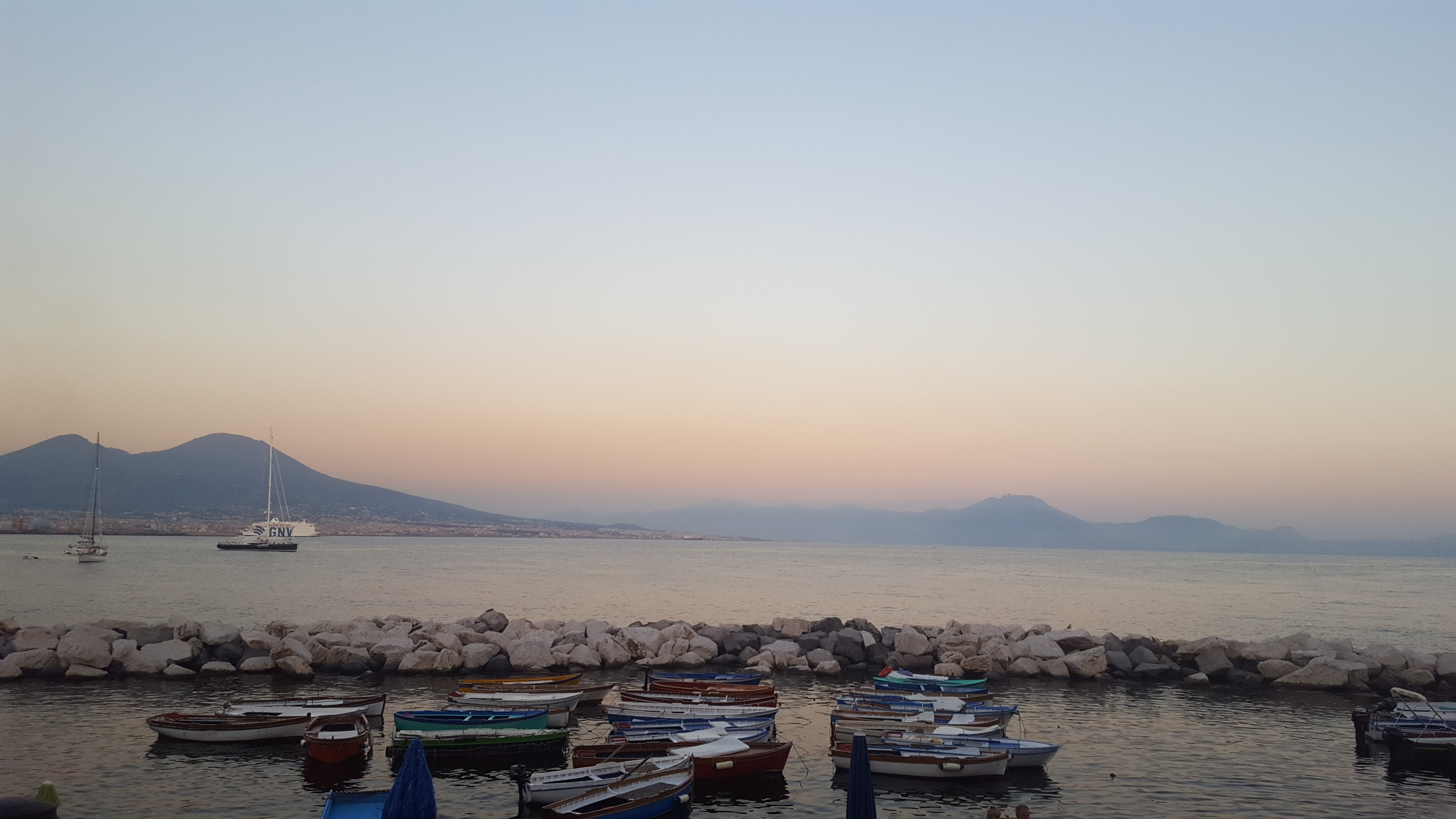
View on the bay of Naples, overlooking Mount Vesuvius at sunset

Evening is the period of a day that begins at the end of afternoon and overlaps with the beginning of night. It starts when the sun is close to the horizon and, according to most definitions, spans the period of night before bedtime or midnight. The exact times when evening begins and ends are subjective and depend on location and time of year. In some cases, evening is considered to begin during daylight; before sunset.

== Etymology ==
The word is derived from the Old English ǣfnung, meaning 'the coming of evening, sunset, time around sunset', which originated from æfnian, meaning "become evening, grow toward evening". The Old English æfnian originated from æfen (eve), which meant "the time between sunset and darkness", and was synonymous with even (Old English æfen), which meant the end of the day. The use of "evening" dates from the mid-15th century.

== Timing ==
The Encyclopædia Britannica defines evening as varying according to daylight and lifestyle, but says that many people consider it to begin at 5 p.m. In a social context, the Oxford English Dictionary defines evening as starting at 6 pm or sunset, whichever is earlier.

The end of evening is around the time when one goes to bed, or around 9 pm, depending on context.

== Astronomy ==
Despite the less favorable lighting conditions for optical astronomy, evening can be useful for observing objects orbiting close to the Sun. Both evening and morning serve as the optimal times for viewing the inferior planets Venus and Mercury. It is a popular time to hunt for comets, as their tails grow more prominent as these objects draw closer to the Sun. The evening (and morning) twilight is used to search for near-Earth asteroids that orbit inside the orbit of the Earth. In mid-latitudes, spring evenings around the time of the equinox―that is, the March one in the Northern Hemisphere and the September equinox to the south of the equator―are favorable for viewing the zodiacal light.

== See also ==
- Crepuscular – Animals that are active primarily in the early morning and the evening.
- Dusk
- Evening dress (disambiguation)
- Sunset
- Eve of a feast or vigil
