= Alexandra Bircken =

German artist

- Born: 1967 (age 58–59); Cologne, Germany
- Education: BA in Fashion Design, Central Saint Martins

Alexandra Bircken (1967) is a German artist based in Berlin and Munich. Bircken creates assemblages featuring everyday ephemera like wood, knitted fragments and twigs. Her work has strong references to traditional craft practices and to the natural world, from which she sources her materials.

== Early life and education ==
Bircken was born in Cologne, Germany. She was brought up nearby in Remscheid. Her father was a motor engineer, but later worked for the weapons firm Mauser and Heckler & Koch. Bircken, who was part of Germany's peace movement, disliked this intensely and felt ashamed of her father.

In secondary school, aged 15, Bircken became friends with Lutz Huelle and Wolfgang Tillmans. In 1992, Tillmans, who was studying photography at Bournemouth, used Bircken and Huelle in a fashion shoot called Like Brother and Sister published in i-D Magazine.

As a child, she wanted to become a surgeon, as she had issues with her intestines which made her interested in the body.

In 1991, Bircken moved to London to study for a BA in Fashion Design from Central Saint Martins, graduating in 1995. Whilst there, she lived in Brixton.

After graduating, Bircken founded a fashion label with a colleague, but quickly became frustrated with the restrictions of the fashion industry.

== Career ==
Bircken's work explores the body, textiles, mechanics and feminism.

From 2000-2008, Bircken taught at Central Saint Martins. Since 2018, she has been a professor at the Academy of Fine Arts in Munich.

Bircken has been awarded artist residencies at Kölnischer Kunstverein in Cologne (2004), Studio Voltaire in London (2011) and the British Council in Harare, Zimbabwe (2014).

== Exhibitions ==
Bircken's work has been exhibited at Museum Abteiberg (Mönchengladbach), Kunstverein Hannover, New Museum (New York), National Gallery of Zimbabwe, Stedelijk Museum (Amsterdam), the Hepworth Wakefield (Yorkshire), and Whitechapel Gallery (London). In 2019, her work was included in the group exhibition, May You Live In Interesting Times, curated by Ralph Rugoff and presented at the 58th International Art Exhibition of La Biennale di Venezia in Italy.

=== Solo exhibitions ===
Date	Exhibition	Place
2019	Unruhe	Secession, Vienna, AT
2018	Mammal	Studio Voltaire, London, UK
2017	Stretch	Museum Abteiberg, Mönchengladbach, DE
2017	Stretch	Crédac, Ivry-sur-Seine, FR
2017	Ping	BQ, Berlin, DE
2016	Parallelgesellschaften	K21 Ständehaus, Düsseldorf, DE
2016	Stretch	Kunstverein Hannover, Hannover, DE
2016	Needle	Herald St, London, UK
2015	Cagey	Piece*Unique, Cologne, DE
2014		Museum Boijmans van Beuningen, Rotterdam, NL
2014	Eskalation	The Hepworth Wakefield, Wakefield, UK
2014	B.U.F.F.	BQ, Berlin, DE
2013	Inside out	BQ, Berlin, DE
2012		Herald St, London, UK
2012	Hausrat	Kunstverein Hamburg, Hamburg, DE
2012	Ganzjährige Präsentation im Foyer	Bonner Kunstverein, Bonn, DE
2011		Studio Voltaire, London, UK
2011	Think of me	Kimmerich, New York, US
2010	Blondie	Kölnischer Kunstverein, Cologne, DE
2010	STORNO	BQ, Los Angeles, US
2009	Crossings	Herald St, London, UK
2009	Alles muß raus!	BQ, Berlin, DE
2008	Ursula Blickle Stiftung	Kraichtal-Unteröwisheim, DE
2008	Open Space	BQ, Art Koln 08, Cologne, DE
2008	Units	Docking Station, Stedelijk Museum, Amsterdam, NL
2007	Holz	Gladstone Gallery, New York, US
2007	Statements	Herald St, Art Basel 37, Basel, CH
2007	Holz	Gladstone Gallery, New York, US
2006		BQ, Cologne, DE (cat)
2005		Herald St, London, UK
2004		BQ, Cologne, DE (cat)

=== Group exhibitions ===
Date	Exhibition	Place
2019	May You Live In Interesting Times	58th International Art Exhibition of La Biennale di Venezia, Venice, IT
2019		Herald St, Museum St, London, UK
2019	Tainted Love (club edit)	Villa Arson, Nice, FR
2019	Sick and Desiring	Hordaland Kunstsenter, Bergen, NL
2018	Naked	Museum Kranenburgh, Bergen, NL
2018	The Revolutionary Suicide Mechanised Regiment Band, Part 2	Rob Tufnell, London, UK
2018	ISelf Collection: Bumped Bodies	Whitechapel Gallery, London, UK
2018	Alexandra Bircken, Josh Brand, Matthew Darbyshire, Michael Dean, Cary Kwok, Amalia Pica, Nicole Wermers	Herald St, Museum St, London, UK
2017	The problem with having a body / is that it always needs to be somewhere	The Approach Gallery, London, UK
2016	Trolley	Glasgow International, Tramway, Glasgow, UK
2015	Mapping Bucharest: Art, Memory and Revolution 1916–2016	MAK – Austrian Museum of Contemporary Art, Vienna, AT
2015	Markus Amm, Alexandra Bircken, Michael Dean	Herald St – Golden Sq, London, UK
2015	War Games	Marlborough Chelsea, New York, US
2015	Wo ist hier? #2: Raum und Gegenwart, Bildhauerei und Installation seit 2000	Kunstverein Reutlingen, Reutlingen, DE
2015	Rates of Exchange	Museum of Contemporary Art, Zagreb, HR
2015	Basket Case II	National Gallery, Bulawayo, ZW
2014	Basket Case II	National Gallery of Zimbabwe, Harare, ZW
2014	Blicke! Koerper! Sensationen!	Deutsches Hygiene Museum, Dresden, DE
2014	Ökonomie der Aufmerksamkeit	Kunsthalle Wien, Vienna, AT
2014	The Great Outdoors	Schaufenster, Berlin, DE
2014	Humain non humain	Fondation d’entreprise Ricard, Paris, FR
2014	Die Antwort der Dinge	Lothringer 13, Munich, DE
2014	Fiber in Form	Institute of Contemporary Art, Boston, US
2013	The Love of Things	Kunsthalle Münster, Münster, DE
2013	Days in Lieu, curated by Rodolphe von Hofmannsthal	David Zwirner, London, UK
2013	Nur hier – Sammlung zeitgenössischer Kunst der Bundesrepublik Deutschland / Ankäufe von 2007 – 2011	Bundeskunsthalle, Bonn, DE
2012	A Disagreeable Object	SculptureCenter, New York, US
2012	Everyday Abstract – Abstract Everyday	James Cohan Gallery, New York, US
2012	Neuralgie	Kunstraum Düsseldorf, Düsseldorf, DE
2012	Made in Germany Zwei	International Art in Germany, Sprengel Museum, Hannover, DE
2011	My Beautiful Mongo	Thomas Brambilla, Bergamo, IT
2011	Skulpturales Handeln	Haus der Kunst, Munich, DE (cat)
2011		EX3 Centro per l'Arte Contemporanea, Florence, IT
2011	Mailles. Art en laine	Maison du Danemark, Paris, FR
2011	Arthur Bokskamp-Stiftung	Hohenlockstedt, DE
2011	Gesamtkunstwerk: New Art From Germany	Saatchi Gallery, London, UK
2011	Wash, then dance	Tinderbox, Hamburg, DE
2011	H x W x D	Wentrup, Berlin, DE
2010	Every Night, I go to Sleep	Modern Art, London, UK
2010	Undone	Henry Moore Institute, Leeds, UK
2010	Rive Droite / Rive Gauche	Paris, FR (cat)
2010	Feint Art	Kunstverein Freiburg, Freiburg, DE
2010	Same slight Slighter	Renwick Gallery, New York, US
2010	The Long Dark, curated by Michelle Cotton	Kettle’s Yard, Cambridge, UK
2010		Museum Kunst Palast, Düsseldorf, DE
2010		Kimmerich Gallery, New York, US
2010	Neues Rheinland. Eine postironische Generation	Museum Morsbroich, Leverkusen, DE
2010	Folklore?	CRAC Alsace, Altkirch, FR
2009	Your Gold Teeth II, curated by Todd Levin	Marianne Boesky, New York, US
2009	Arrival Inside	Mary Mary, Glasgow, UK
2009	The Long Dark, curated by Michelle Cotton	The International 3, Manchester, UK
2008	Borders	Museum Boijmans Van Beuningen, Rotterdam, NL
2008	Hooking Up, curated by Klaus Kertess	View 14, Mary Boone, New York, US
2008	Martian Museum of terrestrial Art, curated by Francesco Manacorda	Barbican Art Gallery, London, UK
2008	Paradies und zurück	Zeitgenössische Kunst im Schloss Dyck, Jüchen, DE
2008	Anti-Baby Pill	Aktualisierungraum, Hamburg, DE
2008	Vom Gehen in viele Richtungen	701 e.V. zu Gast im KIT - Kunst im Tunnel, Düsseldorf, DE
2008		1st Brussels Biennial, Brussels, BE
