= Democratic ideals =

Concept in political philosophy

Democratic ideals is an expression used to refer to personal qualities or standards of government behavior that are felt to be essential for the continuation of a democratic policy.

In the 20th century, T. H. Marshall proposed what he believed to be central democratic ideals in his seminal essay on citizenship, citing three different kinds of rights: civil rights that are the basic building blocks of individual freedom; political rights, which include the rights of citizens to participate in order to exercise political power; and finally social rights, which include the right to basic economic welfare and security.

The importance of human rights is often listed as a central democratic ideal, as well as instilling in military and civilian governmental personnel the attitudes and methods which will prevent their actions from infringing on those rights. The United States Bill of Rights in the Constitution of the United States is an example of the democratic ideal of human rights and liberties being implemented in the foundation of a country's governance. These individual freedoms include freedom of speech, freedom of assembly, freedom of religion and the right to a fair trial. Voter enfranchisement and political participation are two key democratic ideals that ensure the engagement of citizens in the political sphere. Who has the right to suffrage has changed over the centuries and universal suffrage is necessary for a nation to be considered a democracy and not a dictatorship.

These resemble similarities within the British Parliament system, where there’s a makeshift hierarchy but the American upper house holds more importance in terms of power within the political system. The British political system is also made up of an executive, legislative and judicial branch which runs throughout the Westminster Parliament. The executive branch is made up of ministers who run the country, are responsible for proposing legislation and developing foreign internal policies, headed by the Prime Minister. All government ministers are members of the legislative branch, also reflective of the American political system. The Supreme Court is the highest court within the political system of Great Britain, which is where the judicial branch ensures that laws are passed, obeyed and reviewed by a senior minister. The British Parliament consists of the House of Commons, the House of Lords and the Monarch. The system is bicameral, meaning Lords as the upper house and Commons as the lower. The House of Commons has the most authority above all in British politics, it consists of 650 seats with each person representing a different part of the United Kingdom - This is called a constituency.

== Other uses of the term ==
In historical texts, the phrase is often used to denote aspirations or norms of behavior, separate from a functioning democracy, including egalitarianism, self-government, self-determination and freedom of conscience.

== See also ==
- Athenian democracy
- Civil rights
- Constitutional liberalism
- Democratic socialism
- Direct and indirect democracy
- Due process
- Egalitarianism
- Equality before the law
- Liberal democracy
- Natural rights
- Open society
- Pluralism (political philosophy)
- Popular sovereignty
- Social democracy
