= Jesús del Pozo =

Spanish fashion designer

Jesús del Pozo (21 December 1946 – 13 August 2011) was a Spanish fashion designer. Del Pozo was the recipient of numerous professional awards during his career.

== Early life ==
Jesús del Pozo was born on December 21, 1946, in Madrid, Spain.

== Trajectory ==
In 1974, he opened his first men’s fashion store, and in 1976 he presented his first men’s collection at the SEHM in Paris. From 1980 onward, he presented his women’s prêt-à-porter collections at the Cibeles fashion show in Madrid. In 1989, he showed at the Fashion Foundation in Tokyo, and in 1990 at La Cour Carrée at the Louvre in Paris.

In 1992, Jesús del Pozo entered the world of perfume with «Duende», his first feminine fragrance, followed by «Quasar» (1994), «Esencia de Duende» (1996), «Halloween» (1997), «Quasar Adventure» (1999), «J. del Pozo In Black» (2005), «Halloween kiss» (2008) and «Ámbar» (2010). At the same time, between 1992 and 1994, he created lingerie, jewellery and scarf collections. At the end of 1996 he presented «Moda Barcelona», his first bridal prêt-à-porter collection. The same year, he began to industrially produce his women’s prêt-à-porter collections. In 1997, he launched a new brand, «J.D.P.», in Japan, together with Daimaru Inc, with a presence in five department stores.

He designed uniforms like those worn by staff at the Spanish pavilion in the Seville Universal Exposition in 1992, as well as costumes for theatre, ballet and cinematic opera. Special mention should be given to his work as costume designer of Bizet’s Carmen (Madrid Royal Theatre, 1998–1999); the zarzuela El juramento (Zarzuela Theatre, 2000), and the opera Farnace, by Vivaldi, for which he also did the set design.

In 1999, he pushed for the creation of the Asociación Creadores de Moda de España, over which he presided until December 2000. 2001 saw the creation of his new line for children «Jesús del Pozo Junior» and the fragrances «On él» and «On ella». In 2002, he presented a new line of tableware designed by him and made by VistaAlegre. The following year he created the Jesús del Pozo Foundation, and from 2004 onwards he organized the «Course for Professional Expertise in Fashion Design: Business Internship»

== The brand ==
The Spanish designer Jesús del Pozo founded the fashion company of the same name in 1974. His work and his collections stood out due to their strong personality and the undeniable style of the designer. After four decades in the world of fashion, it is considered to be one of the most renowned and credible Spanish houses on a national level. Following the death of the founder in August 2011, Grupo Perfumes y Diseño acquired the brand. Months after, the fashion company rebranded the label as DELPOZO, hiring Josep Font as its Creative Director. Font stepped down in fall of 2018; Lutz Huelle is the current Creative Director of the label.

== Awards ==
Jesús del Pozo has received numerous awards:

- 1981. Golden Needle. Best International Collection of the year.
- 1989. Cristóbal Balenciaga National Award for Best Spanish Designer.
- 1992. Golden «T» by Telva for Best Women’s Fragrance for «Duende». Specialized Press Award for Best Collection of the Year.
- 1994. Golden«T» by Telva for Best Men’s Fragrance for «Quasar».
- 1998. Gold Medal for Fine Arts, presented by H. M. King Juan Carlos I.
- 1999. «T» Award by Telva for Best Spanish Designer.
- 2000. Commemorative stamp for Fashion, issued by Spanish Postal Service Directorate General (D. G. De Correos).
- 2004. Glamour Magazine. Best Women’s Fragrance of the Year «Halloween».
- 2004. GQ Magazine. Best Men’s Fragrance of the Year «Quasar».
- 2004. Award for the best children’s collection Autumn-Winter 2004 «FIMI».
- 2006. Cosmopolitan magazine. Best perfume design «J. del Pozo In Black».
- 2007. Bufí and Planas award. Awarded for his passion for teaching young people.
- 2008. Cosmopolitan Magazine Award for best perfume design for J.del Pozo In White.

== Exhibitions ==
- 20 Icons of the Twentieth Century, 2006, Palma de Mallorca, and June 2008 in Madrid.
- Madrid Fashion New York, November 2007.
- Spanish Mile in SOHO, June 2008.
