= Constitutional liberalism =

Form of government

Constitutional liberalism is a form of government that upholds the principles of classical liberalism and the rule of law. It differs from liberal democracy in that it is not about the method of selecting government.

The journalist and scholar Fareed Zakaria explains that constitutional liberalism "is about government's goals. It refers to the tradition, deep in Western history, that seeks to protect an individual's autonomy and dignity against coercion, whatever the source—state, church, or society". In a constitutionally liberal state, a liberal market is regulated and protected at the level of the constitution and so trade is mostly free, but not entirely unhampered.

Throughout history, democracy is becoming more common around the world, but it has been in decline for the last several decades. Freedom House reported that in 2018 there were 116 electoral democracies. Many of these countries are not constitutionally liberal and can be described as illiberal democracies.

Constitutional liberalism is different from liberal constitutionalism. While the former asserts values of personal sovereignty at a constitutional level, the latter guards freedom to assert ones own values in the constitution. Liberal constitutionalism, according to sociologist Kim Lane Scheppele, "honored the rights of individuals by setting limits on what governments could do in the name of majorities and requiring that the institutions of a democratic state remain accountable and limited."

== See also ==
- Classical liberalism
- Constitutionalism
- Democratic ideals
- History of democracy
- Illiberal democracy
- Liberal democracy
- Night-watchman state
- Social liberalism
