= HIV i-Base =

British HIV/AIDS charity

- Abbreviation: i-Base
- Established: 2000
- Location: United Kingdom
- Website: Official website

HIV i-Base is a UK-based HIV treatment activist charity.

i-Base produces information about advances in HIV treatment for health workers and HIV positive people.

== Publications ==
i-Base publishes easy-to-read guides to HIV treatment.

These non-technical guides have been translated into more than 35 languages by HIV organisations in other countries.

HIV Treatment Bulletin (HTB) is the UK's longest running community HIV treatment publication.

From 1996 to 2000, HTB was published as DrFax by the AIDS Treatment Project.

In 2007, i-Base collaborated with the photographer Wolfgang Tillmans to publish Why We Must Provide Treatment Information. (2007).

== Community partners in research ==
i-Base founded and developed the UK-CAB network of treatment activists, currently with more than 850 members.

This enables HIV positive people to collaborate with many leading HIV research networks. Some of these research studies have changed the way that HIV is treated globally. For example:

The international START Study (Strategic Timing of Antiretroviral Treatment) provided evidence for the importance of universal access to HIV treatment for all HIV positive people globally. Previously treatment was restricted until HIV had more seriously damaged a person's immune system.

The international PARTNER studies, published in JAMA in 2014 and the Lancet in 2019 produced the largest dataset showing that effective HIV treatment prevents HIV sexual transmission even without the need for condoms.

== Original research ==
i-Base has presented original research at UK BHIVA medical conferences on UK HIV services, readability of patient information, and UK HIV testing.

HIV i-Base is a registered charity, founded in 2000.

== See also ==
- HIV/AIDS in the United Kingdom
