= Juan Pablo Echeverri =

Colombian artist (1978–2022)

Juan Pablo Echeverri Muñoz (22 November 1978 – 15 June 2022) was a Colombian visual artist known for his self-portraits and a reflection on self-image and stereotypes.

== Life and career ==
Echeverri was born in Bogotá, Colombia.

Around 1995, as he began studying visual arts at Pontifical Xavierian University, he sporadically started taking 4×5 cm pictures for his personal diaries. When this became a daily habit, the compendium of the pictures became a long-term project titled Miss Fotojapón.

One year after his graduation, in 2003, Miss Fotojapón earned Echeverri a solo show at Bogotá Museum of Modern Art. In 2010, a fraction of this piece was acquired by the Museum of the Bank of the Republic for its permanent collection. In 2022, Miss Fotojapón had more than 8000 pictures, and had been exhibited at the Saatchi Gallery in London as part of the From Selfie to Self-Expression exhibition in 2017, and included in the books 500 Self-Portraits (2018) and Younger than Jesus Directory (2009), both published by Phaidon Press.

Echeverri also created short series that, according to critics Jaime Cerón and Andrés Isaac, dealt with the construction of the persona and the stereotype-based perception of the "other". Some of these series—Fantasía de Macho maduro (2001), merengue glacé (2007), Supersonas (2011), futuroSEXtraños (2016) and Muertos Vivientes (2019)—have been displayed in venues such as the Colombian National Museum in Bogotá, Biennial of Contemporary Art in Ireland (2018), and the Rencontres d'Arles in France (2017).

Echeverri was a close collaborator with German photographer Wolfgang Tillmans from 2012, both setting up exhibitions and as a member of some of his musical projects.

== Death ==
Echeverri died from malaria in June 2022 at the age of 43.
