= Evening dress =

Evening dress, evening attire, or evening wear may refer to:

- Evening gown or evening dress
- Full evening dress or white tie, a formal Western dress code
- Black tie, a semi-formal Western dress code for evening events
- Evening Attire (horse), an American Thoroughbred racehorse
- Evening Attire Stakes, an annual Thoroughbred horse race in Queens, New York
- Evening Dress (film), a 1986 film directed by Bertrand Blier

== See also ==
- Full dress uniform, a permitted supplementary alternative equivalent to the civilian white tie for evening wear
- Mess dress uniform, a permitted supplementary alternative equivalent to the civilian black tie for evening wear
