= Hyperpolitics =

2023 book by Anton Jäger

- Author: Anton Jäger
- Translator: Daniela Janser, Thomas Zimmermann and Heinrich Geiselberger (German edition)
- Language: English
- Subject: Political participation, political institutions and democracy
- Publisher: Suhrkamp Verlag (German edition); Verso Books (English edition)
- Publication date: 11 October 2023 (German edition); February 2026 (English edition)
- Media type: Print and e-book
- Pages: 136 (German edition)128 (English edition)
- ISBN: 978-3-518-12797-1 German edition ISBN 978-1-83674-207-4 English edition

Hyperpolitics: Extreme Politicization without Political Consequences is a book by Belgian historian Anton Jäger. It examines the growth of political argument and protest alongside the decline of political parties, trade unions and other membership organisations. Jäger uses the term "hyperpolitics" for a period in which politics is highly visible but often fails to produce lasting organisations or political change.

The book was written in English. A German translation by Daniela Janser, Thomas Zimmermann and Heinrich Geiselberger was published by Suhrkamp Verlag in October 2023.

== Synopsis ==
Jäger describes political life through two measures. The first is politicization, which concerns the strength of political interest, conflict and identification. The second is institutionalization, which concerns participation through organizations such as political parties, trade unions, churches and clubs.

The term "hyperpolitics" is used by Jäger to characterize the prevailing political form of a distinct time period beginning "Somewhere in the middle of the 2010s" and continuing to the present. Within this period political movements are held to rarely produce significant policy changes but instead generate a mass of highly politicized discourse and media which is further amplified through an increasingly digitized Public sphere.

== Reception ==
Matthias Warkus reviewed the German edition for Die Zeit. He accepted that the book addressed a recognisable feature of contemporary politics, but questioned the evidence behind its explanation. Warkus criticised the limited treatment of Eastern Europe, globalisation, racism, sexism and antisemitism. He also argued that the book expected readers to accept its Marxist assumptions without explaining or defending them fully. John Livesey reviewed the English edition in Jacobin. He called it a brief but compelling account of the weakening of collective political power. Livesey wrote that the book connected present-day online disputes with the earlier decline of parties, unions and other organisations. The Guardian discussed the book's growing readership among writers and people connected with the British left. Zoe Williams found Jäger's descriptions of modern political movements persuasive, but questioned whether his account gave enough weight to the financial resources available to right-wing organisations.
