= Epistemic democracy =

Range of views in political science and philosophy

Epistemic democracy refers to a range of views in political science and philosophy which see the value of democracy as based, at least in part, on its ability to make good or correct decisions. Epistemic democrats believe that the legitimacy or justification of democratic government should not be exclusively based on the intrinsic value of its procedures and how they embody or express values such as fairness, equality, or freedom. Instead, they claim that a political system based on political equality can be expected to make good political decisions, and possibly decisions better than any alternative form of government (e.g., oligarchy, aristocracy, or dictatorship).

Theories of epistemic democracy are concerned with the ability of democratic institutions to do such things as communicate, produce, and utilise knowledge, engage in forms of experimentation, aggregate judgements and solve social problems. Based on such abilities, democracy is said to be able to track some standard of correctness, such as the truth, justice, the common good, or the collective interest. Epistemic democracy as such does not recommend any particular form of democracy – whether it be direct, representative, participatory, or deliberative – and epistemic democrats themselves disagree over such questions. Instead, they are united by a common concern for the epistemic value of inclusive and equal political arrangements. Epistemic democrats are therefore often associated with ideas such as collective intelligence and the wisdom of crowds.

Epistemic arguments for democracy have a long history in political thought and can be found in the work of figures such as Aristotle, Jean-Jacques Rousseau, Nicolas de Condorcet, and John Dewey. In contemporary political philosophy and political science, advocates of epistemic democracy include David Estlund, Hélène Landemore, Elizabeth Anderson, Joshua Cohen, Robert Goodin, and Kai Spiekermann.

== Overview ==
Theories of epistemic democracy see the value of democracy as based, at least in part, on the ability of democratic procedures to make good or correct decisions, where 'good' and 'correct' are normally defined in respect to some procedure-independent standard. This independent standard may be the truth, justice, the common good, or the collective interest. Epistemic democrats therefore claim that democracy is not valuable solely because it embodies or expresses certain intrinsic values. Instead, it is thought to also take decisions which can track some conception of the truth, justice or the common good. Such views therefore often take there to be an important instrumental component to any defence or justification of democratic government.

Views along these lines are contrasted with purely procedural theories of democracy. Pure proceduralism refers to the view that the value and justification of democracy rests solely in the fairness or intrinsic value of democratic institutions. What matters on these views is that democracy embodies or expresses important values – such as equality, freedom, or autonomy – rather than the quality of the outcomes they produce. The only way to evaluate the quality of a political decision on such a view is therefore to look back at the procedure which produced it. They ask whether the decision was taken in a free and fair manner, and if so, judge it to be a good decision. In contrast, epistemic democrats think that political decisions can be judged by some standards which are independent of the procedures which produced them. They can therefore ask, irrespective of whether the decision was taken in a free or fair way, if it tracked some conception of the truth, justice, or the common good.

Epistemic democracy is therefore analogous to what John Rawls referred to as "imperfect procedural justice." Rawls states that imperfect procedural justice takes there to be independent criteria which define whether an outcome is correct or better. Unlike perfect procedural justice, however, which takes there to be a procedure which can guarantee the right outcome, imperfect procedural justice looks for procedures which can achieve the right outcomes to some level of reliability. An example is trial by jury where legal guilt or innocence are the standards of correctness which the jury aims at in their decision. While there is no guarantee that juries will always convict the guilty and not the innocent, they are thought to track these standards most of the time and therefore with some level of reliability.

For epistemic democrats, then, democracy is analogous to a criminal trial but where the independent standards are not legal guilt or innocence, but truth, justice or the common good. While there is no guarantee that democratic decisions will always track these standards, epistemic democrats argue that they will tend to track them, or that they will tend to track them more often than their alternatives. An argument for the epistemic merits of democracy will therefore be probabilistic. They claim that democracy 'tends' to produce good decisions, not that it always will.

Because it sees independent standards as an important part of democracy, epistemic democrats reject forms of pure proceduralism where democracy is valuable for exclusively intrinsic reasons. They do not, however, necessarily need to deny any procedural or intrinsic value to democracy. Arguments about the ability of democracy to achieve independent standards are freestanding and conceptually independent of procedural arguments. Epistemic democracy therefore includes positions which take democracy to be solely justified on epistemic grounds, and positions which combine epistemic and procedural considerations.

While epistemic democracy is commonly defined in respect to the importance placed on procedure-independent standards, there are a range of epistemological accounts of democracy which do not clearly fit this description. One example is pragmatist inspired views which focus on how the justification of democracy is based not on certain moral or ethical values but rather epistemic commitments. For instance, if people wish to have correct beliefs, it may be that they should be open to all objections and arguments against their existing views, and this then commits them to an open and inclusive process of inquiry. Contemporary advocates for this kind of view include Robert Talisse and Cheryl Misak. Jürgen Habermas' democratic theory similarly involves an epistemic component in that he sees deliberation as a process for testing validity claims, such as to empirical truth or moral rightness, which aim to gain acceptance. He, however, considers his view to be a pure proceduralist one. Fabienne Peter also offers a view she calls "pure epistemic proceduralism" which does not rely on independent standards of correctness. Instead, she argues that a decision is legitimate "if it is the outcome of a process that satisfies certain conditions of political and epistemic fairness." As a result, the definition of epistemic democracy may be drawn more broadly to include not only accounts which involve procedure-independent standards, but other kinds of epistemic considerations.

== Historical background ==
Hélène Landemore argues that epistemic arguments for democracy have a long pedigree within the history of political thought. She suggest that these arguments date back at least to the Greeks and can be found in a diverse range of authors including Machiavelli, Spinoza, Rousseau, Condorcet, John Stuart Mill and John Dewey.

In what Jeremy Waldron has referred to as "the doctrine of the wisdom of the multitude", for instance, Aristotle offers a version of such an argument focused on democratic deliberation. This can be found in book III, chapter 11, of the Politics:

[T]he many, who are not as individuals excellent men, nevertheless can, when they have come together, be better than the few best people, not individually but collectively, just as feasts to which many contribute are better than feasts provided at one person's expense. (Politics III, 11, 1281a41–1281b2; trans. Reeve 1998: 83)

Aristotle also refers to the feast analogy in chapter 15:

Taken individually, any one of these people is perhaps inferior to the best person. But a city-state consists of many people, just like a feast to which many contribute, and is better than one that is a unity and simple. That is why a crowd can also judge many things better than any single individual. (Politics III, 15, 1286a27–33; trans. Reeve 1998: 94)

For Waldron, these passages seem to suggest that group deliberation may allow for better results than can be produced by any one individual because it allows for the pooling of information, arguments, insights, and experiences. Just as people will make different contributions to a feast, they will offer varied contributions to political decision making so that the group is superior to the one. It is unclear, however, whether Aristotle meant this argument as a defence of democracy. This is because an oligarchy or aristocracy may also benefit from this collective pooling of talents when compared to the decisions of a single king or dictator. Waldron therefore suggests that while a strong interpretation of Aristotle's wisdom of the multitude would see it as defending democratic deliberation over the deliberations of any smaller group, a weaker interpretation would see it as only rejecting rule by one.

According to Landemore, Jean-Jacques Rousseau's account of the general will may also be interpreted as offering an epistemic argument for democratic rule. In The Social Contract, for instance, he writes:

When a law is proposed in the People's assembly, what they are being asked is not exactly whether they approve the proposal or reject it, but whether it does or does not conform to the general will, which is theirs; everyone states his opinion about this by casting his ballot, and the tally of the votes yields the declaration of the general will. ([1762] 1997: 124)

According to this interpretation, Rousseau describes the idea that citizens should vote based on their judgements about whether a proposal coheres with an independent standard of correctness, such as the common interest or good, and that the outcome of a majority vote will offer the correct judgement. This is also suggested in Rousseau's claim that those whose judgement differed from those of the majority should conclude that they there therefore mistaken. In another passage, Rousseau also appears to appeal to the statistical benefits of aggregation and large numbers. In comparing the "general will" to "the will of all" he writes:

There is often a considerable difference between the will of all and the general will: the latter looks only to the common interest, the former looks to private interest, and is nothing but a sum of particular wills; but if, from these same wills, one takes away the pluses and the minuses which cancel each other out, what is left as the sum of the differences is the general will. (ibid, p. 60)

Rousseau's appeal to pluses and minuses cancelling out is similar to the theory of the Miracle of Aggregation found in more recent work in epistemic democracy. This miracle refers to the idea that if errors are randomly distributed, then they will tend to cancel each other out when votes are aggregated, and therefore the majority decision is only influenced by correct votes. These epistemic readings of Rousseau are controversial, however, given that he can also be interpreted in more procedural terms where the general will refers simply to whatever the people want.

Another appeal to the benefits of large numbers can be found in Nicolas de Condorcet's Essays on the Application of Mathematics to the Theory of Decision Making. Providing a mathematical account of the benefits of large groups to decision making, Condorcet argued that majoritarian decisions are all but certain to select the correct option on a simple yes-no decision. This claim required three assumptions to be met: (1) voters make their decisions independently of each other; (2) voters make their decisions sincerely rather than strategically; and (3) each voter has a probability of selecting the correct answer which is greater than 0.5. As long as these conditions hold, then as the voting group becomes larger, the probability that they will select the right answer moves towards 1. While Condorcet developed this theorem with the aim of determining the optimal size of a jury – hence it often being referred to as Condorcet's jury theorem – it has also been applied to the votes of a democratic electorate including all of the population rather than a subset.

Another key figure in the historical tradition which informs work on epistemic democracy is the American pragmatist John Dewey. Dewey's democratic theory offers, in part, a view of democracy as a process of experimentation and inquiry. Rather than seeing it as synonymous with formal political institutions, Dewey instead thought of democracy as a "mode of associated living" which occurred when people came together to identify and solve their collective problems. Democracy provides a process where common sets of problems and interests can be clarified, and solutions debated. Dewey therefore thought that an exclusive focus on majority rule was misplaced, and that the value of democracy came from the preceding public discussion and debates where experiences and values could be expressed, and minorities could voice their opposition. It is through this collective process of inquiry that social intelligence could emerge. This process had to include the public as they had particular knowledge of where social problems occurred given that they experience them directly. As Dewey put it, "the man who wears the shoe knows best that it pinches." A properly functioning democracy still required an educated population, however, and Dewey therefore placed much emphasis on educative reforms aimed at improving citizen competence.

== Procedure-independent standards ==
Contemporary work in epistemic democracy can be broadly separated into two general categories. The first is more foundationalist work concerned with determining the importance and role of independent standards of correctness in any justification of democracy. Such work is therefore concerned with showing why a consideration of such standards is necessary and how best to incorporate them into a democratic theory. The second category is work focused on the more practical task of showing why democratic institutions can in fact track these independent standards, or why people should have confidence that they will make better decisions than non-democratic alternatives.

David Estlund provides a defence of the importance of procedure-independent standards to the justification of democracy. Estlund argues that most defences of democracy either implicitly assume such standards or remain too weak to justify democratic rule. One of his arguments is that if people were to care only for issues of procedural fairness, then they should be as happy with deciding political issues through the flip of a coin as they are through democratic procedures of majority rule. A random procedure, such as a coin flip or the roll of a dice, gives equal weight to the preferences of citizens and would therefore appear to be as procedurally fair as a democratic vote. Estlund therefore argues that if a democratic vote is preferable to a purely random decision, then it must be because of the expectation that it will make the correct decisions with greater reliability than chance.

Estlund is careful to distinguish his epistemic view from what he calls a 'correctness theory' of democracy. According to this theory, a political decision would be legitimate only in the case where it is correct. Any democratic decision which happened to be incorrect would therefore be illegitimate. Instead of a correctness theory, Estlund claims that epistemic democrats can see democracy as legitimate because of its ability to produce good decisions over time.

Jose Luis Marti, alternatively, argues that normal practices of democratic debate and deliberation tends to implicitly assume some independent standards of correctness. They suggest that to argue in favour of a certain decision, policy A, is to aim to show that policy A is the right decision, or that it is better in terms of rightness than policy B, C or D. To engage in political deliberation about competing policies is therefore said to require one to appeal to some standard of correctness other than the political procedure itself. If the only mark of a decision was the decision-making procedure itself, then there could not be any argument or reason for making any particular decision, as making arguments and giving reasons means to appeal to some standard independent of the process and at least somewhat independent of the participants' beliefs and desires.

Epistemic democracy considers exactly which independent standards should define the quality of political decisions. This does not require an endorsement of moral realism about the existence of objective moral facts. Although these standards are independent of the real political decision procedure, they may be dependent on other things. For instance, they may be dependent on an idealised procedure – such as John Rawls' original position or Jürgen Habermas' ideal speech situation – or on the norms and practices of a particular community. Epistemic democrats are not necessarily committed to any crude form of consequentialism, as the independent standards may themselves involve deontological or virtue constraints, such as respect for basic human rights. Epistemic democracy is consistent with many metaethical positions.

A couple of strategies are therefore open to epistemic democrats when considering the role of procedure-independent standards. The first is to specify a particular independent standard. For instance, they could define the standard as the maximisation of happiness or an equality of welfare, and then look to see if democratic institutions meet this standard. Alternatively, they could define the standard as the avoidance of certain bad outcomes, such as wars or famines. The second strategy is to remain ignorant or agnostic on the standards which define a good decision, and instead look for those procedures which can discover correct answers, whatever they may be. Democratic procedures would therefore be treated like well-designed scientific research: instead of democracy being evaluated based on its tendency to produce a presupposed desired result, it would be evaluated based on if it can produce unknown reasonable decisions.

Most epistemic democrats endorse the second strategy. The first faces the problem that people often reasonably disagree over how to define the procedure-independent standards of correctness, and it therefore risks making the justification of democracy dependent on a controversial account of justice or the common good. It also appears problematic from a democratic point of view because it suggests an account of good political decisions can be determined independently of democratic procedures.

The second strategy has itself come under criticism. Sean Ingham, for instance, argues that if democratic procedures could discover the correct answer to political questions, then they would seem to bring an implausibly swift end to deeply held and persistent disagreements. For instance, if there were a democratic procedure which had a 99% chance of selecting the correct answer, then given that this procedure is near infallible, its result would provide such strong evidence in favour of one option that it would have to be accepted as true, even if disagreed upon beforehand. While a 99% reliability may be implausible, Ingham points out that even if the democratic procedure only had a reliability of just over half, then running it multiple times would provide sufficient evidence for people to change their minds. If democracy can track the truth of political questions, it would therefore suggest that long-held disagreements over what counts as a just political decision can easily be settled. Although this argument does not reject the existence of independent standards, it does suggest that their acceptance may be in tension with the idea that there is deep and reasonable political disagreement in society.

Concerned with the problems highlighted by Ingham, Jonathan Benson suggests a third strategy which focuses on identifying epistemic abilities which are necessary for achieving any reasonable conception of justice or the common good. He compares epistemic democrats to a handyman selecting a toolbox. The handyman does not know in advance which tasks they will need to complete and therefore wants a range of tools suitable for handling a variety of jobs. Similarly, political institutions cannot know in advance which conception of justice they will be asked to pursue, and therefore require a range of epistemic tools capable of achieving any reasonable conception. This approach respects persistent disagreement, as it claims only that democracy provides the best epistemic tools, not that it can resolve the normative questions of politics. Questions remain, however, about which epistemic abilities are most important and whether this approach strays too far from the idea—central to epistemic democracy—that democratic procedures can yield “correct” or “good” decisions.

== Models ==
While some theories of epistemic democracy focus on explaining the importance and role of epistemic considerations, others look to explain why it is that democratic procedures can be thought to make good or correct decisions. Some epistemic democrats merely wish to show that democracy can make these decisions with some level of reliability, but others go further in arguing that democracy will tend to make better decisions than any non-democratic alternative. In other words, they aim to show that decisions taken by the many are superior to those taken by the few. Prominent epistemic arguments for democracy within contemporary political science and democratic theory include the following:

=== Jury theorems ===
While first proposed by Nicolas de Condorcet in 1785, discussion of jury theorems and their connection to democracy has continued into contemporary discussion. The original theorem stated that a choice between two options is best made by a large group if: (1) voters make their decisions independently of each other; (2) voters make their decisions sincerely rather than strategically; and (3) each voter has a probability of selecting the correct answer which is greater than 0.5. Under these conditions, the probability of the correct option being selected tends towards 1 as the size of the voting group increases. This means that a democratic vote which includes the whole of the demos will be more reliable than any non-democratic vote which includes a smaller number of voters. Contemporary work on the jury theorem has aimed to relax these assumptions. The theorem has, for instance, been applied to cases of plural voting with multiple options, where voters have lowly correlated votes, and where they make their minds up autonomously instead of fully independently.

In a 2022 study that employed measure-theoretic techniques to explore the probability of the theorem's thesis in various settings, it was discovered that the competence of majority rule as a decision procedure is heavily reliant on the probability measure governing voter competence. The thesis predicted by Condorcet's jury theorem either occurs almost surely or almost never, and the prior probability of the theorem's thesis is zero. Moreover, under specific circumstances, the theorem's opposite outcome holds true, leading to the wrong option being chosen almost surely. Consequently, invoking this theorem necessitates further examination to better comprehend its applicability.

An immediate issue for the jury theorem is the question of the selection of alternative options and how to guarantee that the correct option is offered to voters in the first place. It therefore seems to acquire another procedure which can effectively narrow down the options. Objections have also been made to the relevance of the main assumptions of the theorem to the political context, where voters often engage in debate with others, have different motivations for voting, and often confront complex political problems.

=== Miracle of aggregation ===
Like the jury theorem, the miracle of aggregation also appeals to the benefits of large numbers to defend democratic voting but focuses on the tendency of incorrect votes to cancel each other out. Those voters who are informed will tend to vote for the correct policy, while those who are ignorant will have to vote randomly. The votes of ignorant voters will therefore be distributed evenly among the available options. Once all votes are aggregated, the votes of bad voters will therefore cancel each other out, and the votes of informed voters will decide the outcome. A key assumption of this argument, however, is that those with none or little information will tend to vote randomly. It has therefore been objected that bad voters may in fact make systemic errors in a certain direction, and that their votes will not be completely cancelled out. An important question therefore concerns whether any systemic errors will be large enough to outnumber the more informed voters so as to influence the final outcome.

In relation to the findings of the 2022 study for jury theorems, it has been established that even though, almost surely, at least a proportion $\varepsilon > 0$ of voters is well-informed or almost well-informed the Miracle of Aggregation (MoA) does not occur almost surely using a prior probability measure.

=== Diversity trumps ability ===
The diversity trumps ability theorem was first developed by Lu Hong and Scott Page, but most prominently applied to epistemic democracy by Hélène Landemore. Unlike the previous two arguments which focused on voting, this argument applies to deliberation. According to the theorem, a random selection of cognitively diverse problem solvers can outperform a group of high ability problem solvers if four conditions are met. These are that: (1) the problem is difficult enough; (2) the problem solvers are relatively smart; (3) problem solvers think differently from each other but can still recognise the best solution; and (4) the population from which problem solvers are taken is large and the number selected is not too small. The idea behind the theorem is that a group of high ability individuals will tend to think in similar ways and will therefore converge on a common local optimum. A group of cognitively diverse problem solvers, alternatively, will think very differently and will therefore be able to guide one another past the local optima and to the global optimum. Landemore has then argued that the theorem supports the epistemic quality democratic deliberation involving citizens over the deliberation of any subset of the demos. The epistemic benefit of democratic deliberation is therefore its ability to draw on the cognitive diversity of the demos.

The application of the diversity trumps ability theorem by Hong, Page, and Landemore in the context of epistemic democracy has been met with substantial skepticism from various quarters of the academic community. Thompson's critique asserts that the theorem's mathematical underpinnings do little more than dress up a rather trivial fact. This criticism posits that the theorem, despite its apparent mathematical rigor, may in fact offer nothing more than a formalized iteration of the preconceived hypotheses. The core of the contention is that the theorem's mathematical formulation serves to obscure rather than clarify the true, straightforward nature of the relationship between diversity and problem-solving efficacy.

Further, the critics highlight that when the theorem is stripped of its mathematical trappings, it reveals its inherent triviality. It is suggested that the theorem's conditions and implications are so narrowly defined as to be unrealistic when applied to the workings of actual democratic deliberation. By reframing the theorem with more realistic assumptions, these analyses expose the limitations of the original claims, often concluding that, contrary to the theorem's intentions, ability can indeed eclipse diversity. This rigorous scrutiny aims to demystify the purported complexity of the theorem, warning against its uncritical adoption in socio-political theories and advocating for a more discerning use of mathematics in the exploration of democratic processes.

Many objections to the use of the diversity trumps ability theorem focus on assumption (3). Sometimes referred to as the oracle assumption, it requires that all problem solvers can recognise the best solution when made to think about it. Two challenges have confronted this assumption. The first is the issue of moral pluralism and the idea that participants may disagree on the best solution because they have different value commitments. The second is the issue of complexity and the idea that participants may disagree over the best solution, even if they agree on values, because political problems allow for multiple plausible interpretation. While the oracle assumption is therefore controversial, it has been argued that cognitive diversity may still have value even if all deliberators cannot recognise the best solution, although it becomes unclear in such cases whether such diversity will always trump ability.

=== Experimental models ===
Experimental models are inspired by the work of John Dewey and were introduced into the contemporary debate by Elizabeth Anderson. Rather than rely on formal theorems as the previous arguments do, the experimental model instead sees the democratic institutions of regular elections as allowing for a process of trial-and-error learning. The idea is that when democratic governments enact a new policy, citizens will directly experience its results. Elections, petitions, and protests then give these citizens the opportunity to communicate their experiences back to policy makers, who can then use this information to reform the policy. Democratic procedures therefore offer important feedback mechanisms which allow policy makers to update and improve their policies over time. Anderson also argues that these procedures need to be inclusive so that all possible feedback can be considered. Differently situated citizens will have different experiences of social problems and public policies, and therefore an open and inclusive political process is required to make sure all of these distinctive contributions can be taken into account.

One issue concerning this model is the quality of the feedback signals provided by democratic elections, their frequency, and the extent that they may be affected by such things as voter ignorance or irrationality. There has also been debate over the extent to which Anderson's Dewey inspired model is consistent with Dewey's own democratic theory.

=== Epistemic deliberative democracy ===
A range of related arguments for the epistemic value of democracy can be found in the work of deliberative democrats. Deliberative democracy refers to a conception of democratic politics which places emphasis on the importance of a free and open public discussion. As Simone Chambers puts it, such approaches are talk centric rather than vote centric. While many deliberative democrats see deliberation as intrinsically valuable, many also advocate deliberation based on its instrumental and epistemic benefits. For instance, deliberation has been argued to help achieve forms of rational agreement, to help improve people's understanding of their own preferences and of social problems, and to improve citizen knowledge and beliefs. A large empirical literature has now developed which looks to test these claims and understand the conditions under which deliberation may produce such benefits.

=== Systemic Approaches ===
While most epistemic democrats focus on single democratic mechanisms, such as elections or deliberative forums, systemic approaches examine how multiple democratic institutions work together within a broader network. Jonathan Benson, for instance, argues that the epistemic value of democracy does not lie in any single institution but in the way diverse mechanisms—such as elections, public deliberation, sortition, and the public sphere—interact and complement one another. This approach therefore considers how different parts of a democratic system fit together to produce an outcome that is epistemically superior to its individual components. Benson claims that such approaches can better recognize problems such as voter ignorance, political bias, and elite capture, arguing that these issues need not be fatal to democracy because they can be offset by other parts of the system.

Systemic views, however, also face challenges. Kai Spiekermann, for example, argues that the complexity of systems thinking makes it more difficult to offer empirically testable predictions. Compared to formal approaches—such as Jury Theorems or the Diversity Trumps Ability Theorem—it may therefore be harder for systemic approaches to provide clear, action-guiding advice on how to structure or reform democratic institutions.

=== Reflexivity ===
Although not describing themselves as epistemic democrats, Jack Knight and James Johnson offer an alternative argument based on the concept of reflexivity. They distinguish between first-order institutions which aim to directly address social problems and second-order institutions which aim to coordinate and select between institutions at the first-order. The task of a second-order institution is therefore to coordinate "the ongoing process of selecting, implementing and maintaining effective institutional arrangements," and sustaining an "experimental environment that can enhance our knowledge" of when institutions produce good consequences Democracy is then said to have priority at the second-order because it operates in a reflexive manner. The reflexivity of democratic arrangements derives from the fact that they require "relevant parties to assert, defend, and revise their own views and to entertain, challenge, or accept those of others. It derives, in other words, from ongoing disagreement and conflict." There has, however, been debate over whether democracy best provides this kind of reflexivity. Some authors, for instance, have claimed that reflexivity is more likely to be achieved by decentralised processes, such as system of polycentricity or markets.

== Alternatives ==
Given its aim of defending democracy on epistemic grounds, work on epistemic democracy is closely connected with work which advocates for alternative political institutions for epistemic reasons. In the contemporary debate, four alternatives or part alternatives have received most discussion.

=== Epistocracy ===
Epistocracy refers to a political system based on "rule by the knowers" rather than "rule by the people". While the term was coined by David Estlund, its most prominent advocate has been Jason Brennan, who suggests a range of alternative models of epistocracy. These include proposals for excluding the least knowledgeable voters from the electoral franchise, granting more informed voter more votes than other citizens, or the establishment of an epistocratic veto where a body of knowledgeable members would be able to veto any legislation coming from a democratically elected parliament. Brennan's argument for epistocracy draws heavily on political science studies which are reported to show the political ignorance of many citizens. Based on such work, he argues that uninformed voters subject other members of society to an undue level of risk and therefore violate their supposed right to a competent government.

Although it cannot be assumed a priori that the Condorcet jury theorem or the miracle of aggregation will hold true, it has been proposed that by adding epistemic weights to the decision-making process, these theorems can indeed be upheld. By implementing a weighted majority rule based on stochastic weights correlated with epistemic rationality and guaranteeing a minimal weight equal to one for every voter, a more competent information aggregation mechanism can be achieved. This approach of incorporating epistemic weights while ensuring all votes count, albeit not in the same proportion, addresses potential concerns about disrespect or exclusion in the democratic process. By guaranteeing a minimal weight for every voter, the semiotic objections based on the expressive value of democracy are mitigated. In essence, this method strikes a balance between promoting competent decision-making and preserving the inclusive nature of the democratic process.

Epistocrats have been subject to a range of critiques, however. They have been argued to offer an incomplete and overly pessimistic reading of the empirical literature on voter competence, to rely too heavily on rational choice theory, to not give significant attention to potential democratic reforms, and to underestimate the dangers involved in political exclusion and the empowerment of a knowledgeable minority.

=== Political meritocracy ===
Political meritocracy refers to a political system where leaders and officials are selected, at least in part, on their political abilities. Advocates of such systems, such as Daniel Bell, argue that political leaders require intellectual and academic abilities, effective social skills and emotional intelligence, as well as ethical virtues. They should therefore ideally have exceptional academic qualifications, knowledge of the social sciences, records of good performance in government, and training in ethical philosophy. Political meritocrats then argue that elections are unlikely to select for these kinds of qualities and that political officials should therefore be appointed based on rigorous processes of examination and their record of service at lower levels of government. These authors often look to China and Singapore as imperfect contemporary examples of political meritocracy, and commonly draw on Confucian philosophy in defending the value of meritocratic procedures.

While Bell argues that all national-level political leaders should be selected through systems of examination and promotion—what he calls the China Model—others favor mixed models. These typically involve proposals for bicameral systems that combine an elected legislative chamber with an upper house selected through meritocratic procedures.

Political meritocracy has come under similar criticism to epistocracy, offering a too pessimistic account of voter competence, overestimating the ability of meritocratic procedures to select more able and virtuous leaders, and underestimating the dangers of removing democratic elections and leaving political officials unaccountable to the public. The claim that Confucian philosophy supports political meritocracy is also controversial with many authors defending versions of Confucian democracy.

=== Political decentralisation ===
While epistocracy and political meritocracy may offer full alternatives to democracy, some critical of democracy's epistemic value have instead argued for greater forms of decentralisation. Ilya Somin, for instance, argues that democratic voters have little incentive to become informed about political matters, as their one vote among thousands is very unlikely to affect the outcome. This is known as the problem of rational ignorance most associated with Anthony Downs. Somin therefore advocates for systems of political decentralisation, such as federalism, which would allow greater opportunities for exit. Unlike decisions on how to vote, decisions on which political jurisdiction to live in have significant consequences for individuals and therefore provide them with an incentive to get informed. While political decentralisation does not offer a complete alternative to democracy, it is thought to help increase the epistemic quality of government by supplementing mechanisms of voice with exit. Like supporters of epistocracy, however, Somin has been criticised for too greatly relying on rational choice models, for underestimating the competence of voters, and for underestimating the costs associated with exit.

=== Markets ===
There is also a free-market tradition sceptical of the epistemic quality of democracy which is most often associated with Friedrich Hayek. Hayek argued that any centralised political authority could not possibly acquire all the knowledge relevant for effective social decisions. A key reason for this was the importance he placed on local forms of knowledge about the particular circumstances of time and space. This knowledge was argued to be only known to on-the-spot-individuals, to be open to change over time, and to often involve a tacit component. Hayek therefore claimed that the best way to utilise this dispersed information was not to attempt to centralise it to any government authority, but allow individuals to make the best use of their own information and rely on a system of market prices to coordinate their individual actions. Hayekian authors, such as Mark Pennington, have therefore argued that there are important epistemic advantages to systems based on price signals rather than voters and deliberation, and advocate for expanding the role of markets into otherwise political domains.

These positions have been criticised on the basis that markets cannot provide many of the functions of democratic governments and on their optimistic view of the functioning of market institutions. Jonathan Benson has also argued that consumers often lack the kinds of information needed to make ethically informed decisions in the market place and that markets will often fail to achieve ethical values for epistemic reasons. Instead, he argues that ethical regulation is better provided by forms of political democracy which have a greater capacity to centralise relevant information, including local knowledge and tacit knowledge.

== Selected bibliography ==
- Bell, D. A. (2016). The China model: Political meritocracy and the limits of democracy. Princeton University Press.
- Benson, J (2024). Intelligent Democracy: Answering the New Democratic Scepticism. Oxford University Press.
- Brennan, J. (2016). Against Democracy. Princeton University Press.
- Brennan, J. and H. Landemore (2022). Debating democracy: do we need more or less?. Oxford University Press.
- Caplan, B. (2011). The Myth of the Rational Voter: Why Democracies Choose Bad Policies. Princeton University Press.
- Erikson, R. S., M. B. MacKuen and J. A. Stimson (2002). The Macro Polity. Cambridge University Press.
- Estlund, D. (2009). Democratic Authority: A philosophical framework. Princeton University Press.
- Fishkin, J. S. (2018). Democracy when the people are thinking: Revitalizing our politics through public deliberation. Oxford University Press.
- Goodin, R. E. and K. Spiekermann (2018). An Epistemic Theory of Democracy. Oxford University Press.
- Knight, J. and J. Johnson (2011). The Priority of Democracy: Political consequences of pragmatism. Princeton University Press.
- Landemore, H. (2013). Democratic Reason: Politics, collective intelligence, and the rule of the many. Princeton University Press.
- Misak, C. (2002). Truth, Politics, Morality: Pragmatism and deliberation. Routledge.
- Ober, J. (2008). Democracy and Knowledge: Innovation and learning in classical Athens. Princeton University Press.
- Somin, I. (2016). Democracy and Political Ignorance: Why smaller government is smarter. Stanford University Press.
- Talisse, R. B. (2013). A pragmatist philosophy of democracy. Routledge.

== See also ==
- Collaborative intelligence
- Collective intelligence
- Deliberative democracy
- Democracy
- Technocracy
- Double hermeneutic
- Intersubjectivity
- Jury theorem
- Pragmatism
- Social epistemology
