= Rob Reich =

American political scientist (born c. 1969)

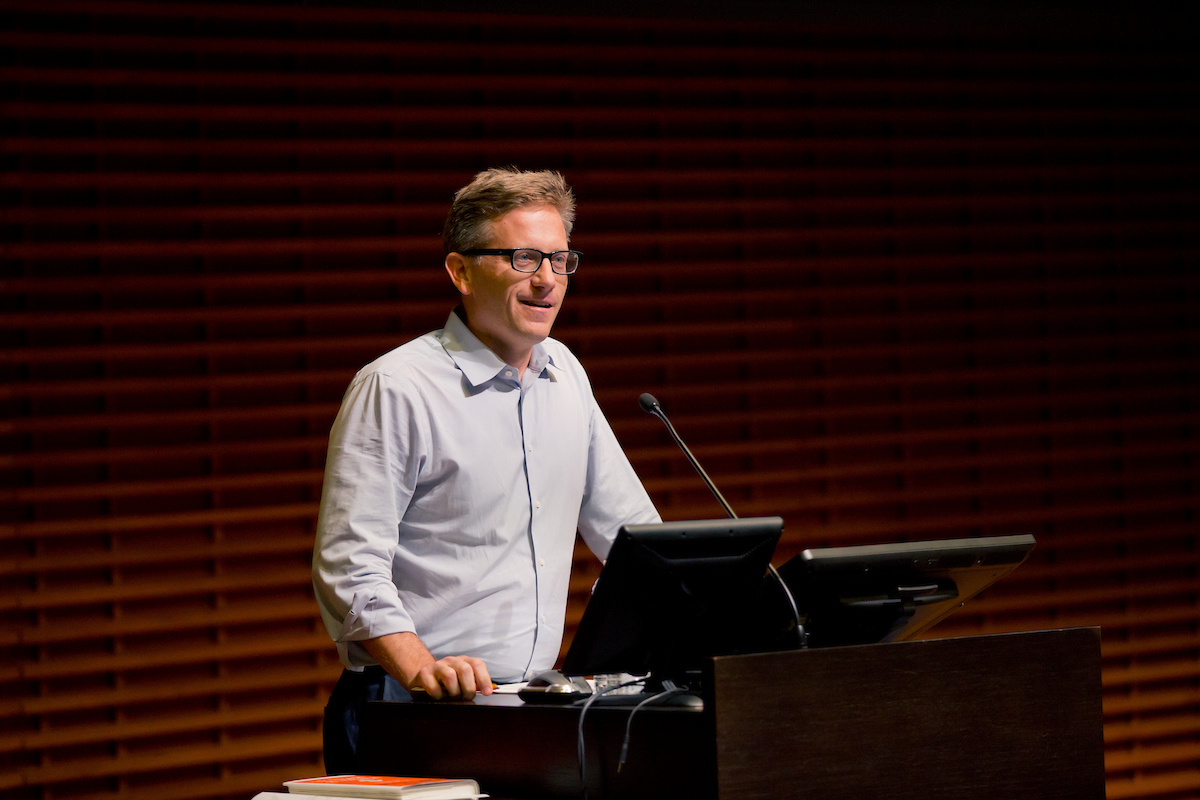
- Reich at Stanford University CEMEX Auditorium on April 12, 2016
- Born: New Jersey, U.S.
- Education: Yale University (BA); Stanford University (PhD)
- Occupation: Professor

Robert C. Reich is an American political scientist and professor. He is the McGregor-Girand Professor of Social Ethics of Science and Technology at Stanford University. He also served the director of Stanford's McCoy Center for Ethics in Society, and the co-director of Stanford's Center on Philanthropy and Civil Society (PACS). Reich currently serves an associate director for Stanford's institute for Human-Centered Artificial Intelligence (HAI). A political theorist, Reich's work focuses primarily on applied ethics, educational inequality and the role of philanthropy in the public sector. Reich's recent work focuses on the governance of frontier science and technology alongside other topics in liberal democratic theory. In 2024–25, Reich served as a Senior Advisor to the United States AI Safety Institute.

== Academic career ==
Reich's research has explored a range of topics in political theory, including the role of philanthropy in democratic societies and the governance of frontier science and technology. Reich's scholarship on the charitable tax deduction, Teach for America, and non-profit status is frequently cited in the New York Times, the Chronicle of Higher Education, and the Chronicle of Philanthropy. He is a contributor to the Boston Review, a magazine co-edited by former Stanford political science professor Joshua Cohen. Reich was the lead author of their 2013 forum on foundations and democracy, and wrote the essay titled, "What are Foundations For?". In 2018, Princeton University Press published Reich's book, Just Giving: Why Philanthropy Is Failing Democracy and How It Can Do Better, which purports to offer a political theory for philanthropy.

Reich has taught courses on justice, public service, philanthropy, practical ethics, and political theory at Stanford. He has received numerous awards for his teaching, including the Walter J. Gores award (Stanford's highest teaching honor) and the Phi Beta Kappa Undergraduate Teaching Prize. He is also a Bass Fellow in Undergraduate Education for "extraordinary contributions to undergraduate education".

In Fall 2016, Reich co-taught "Election 2016" at Stanford University. The course attempted to make sense of an election that defied historical precedent and to take stock of the health of American democracy. "Election 2016" hosted a number of guest speakers including David Plouffe and David Axelrod. It was the centerpiece of a campus-wide campaign of events around the 2016 presidential elections.

Beginning in 2018, with Stanford Professors Mehran Sahami and Jeremy Weinstein, Reich teaches a large introductory course on technology, policy, and ethics, which has been featured in the New York Times and The Nation. The course grew out of the book System Error: Where Big Tech Went Wrong And How We Can Reboot, which was co-written with Sahami and Weinstein.

Since returning to Stanford from the U.S. AI Safety Institute in 2025, Reich has taught a course on AI governance with Nathaniel Persily, Sanmi Koyejo, and Anka Reuel. The course combines the expertise of its instructors in political science, philosophy, computer science, and law.

== Selected publications ==
=== Books ===
- Bridging Liberalism and Multiculturalism in Education (2003)
- Toward a Humanist Justice: The Political Philosophy of Susan Moller Okin (2009), co-edited with Debra Satz
- Education, Justice, and Democracy (2013), co-edited with Danielle Allen, won the 2013 PROSE Award for the best book in education.
- Occupy the Future (2013), co-edited with David Grusky, Doug McAdam, and Debra Satz
- Philanthropy in Democratic Societies: History, Institutions, Values (2016) contributor and co-editor with Lucy Berholz and Chiara Cordelli.
- Just Giving: Why Philanthropy Is Failing Democracy and How It Can Do Better(2018).
- Digital Technology and Democratic Theory (2021) contributor and co-editor with Lucy Berholz and Hélène Landemore.
- System Error: Where Big Tech Went Wrong And How We Can Reboot (2021).

=== Articles ===
- “Repugnant to the Whole Idea of Democracy? On the Role of Foundations in Democratic Societies,” PS: Political Science and Politics, Vol. 49, July 2016.
- “Gift Giving and Philanthropy in Market Democracy,” in Critical Review, Vol. 26, Nos. 3-4.
- "Philanthropy and Caring for the Needs of Strangers," Social Research, Vol. 80, No. 2, Summer 2013.
- "Equality, Adequacy, and K-12 Education," in Education, Justice, and Democracy, Danielle Allen and Rob Reich, eds., University of Chicago Press.
- "Not Very Giving." New York Times, September 5, 2013.
- "Toward a Political Theory of Philanthropy," in Giving Well: The Ethics of Philanthropy, Patricia Illingworth, Thomas Pogge, Leif Wenar, eds., Oxford University Press.

== Service ==
In 2001, Reich and Debra Satz founded the non-profit Hope House Scholars Program to teach humanities to women in Hope House, a substance abuse treatment center for women in Redwood City, California. The pair received the Roland Prize from Stanford for their work on the program. He is also involved with several committees for evaluating undergraduate education, faculty diversity, admission and student life at Stanford.

Reich has worked as a researcher and moderator at the Aspen Institute, and has served on various committees for the Carnegie Foundation for the Advancement of Teaching. He is a co-founder and advisor to the #GivingTuesday campaign, and is currently a board member for the Boston Review. He was a board member for GiveWell, a nonprofit that evaluates charities for donors, between 2013 and March, 2019.

Since 2023, Reich has served as a non-resident fellow for the Carnegie Endowment for International Peace.

== Personal life and education ==
Reich received his B.A. in philosophy from Yale University and his Ph.D. in philosophy of education from Stanford University. His doctoral dissertation was titled Liberalism, multiculturalism, and education.

He is often confused with Robert Reich, professor of political science at the University of California at Berkeley and former U.S. Secretary of Labor. They are not related.

== See also ==
- Ethics of philanthropy
- Ethics of artificial intelligence
- AI governance
