= Chiara Cordelli =

Italian political scientist

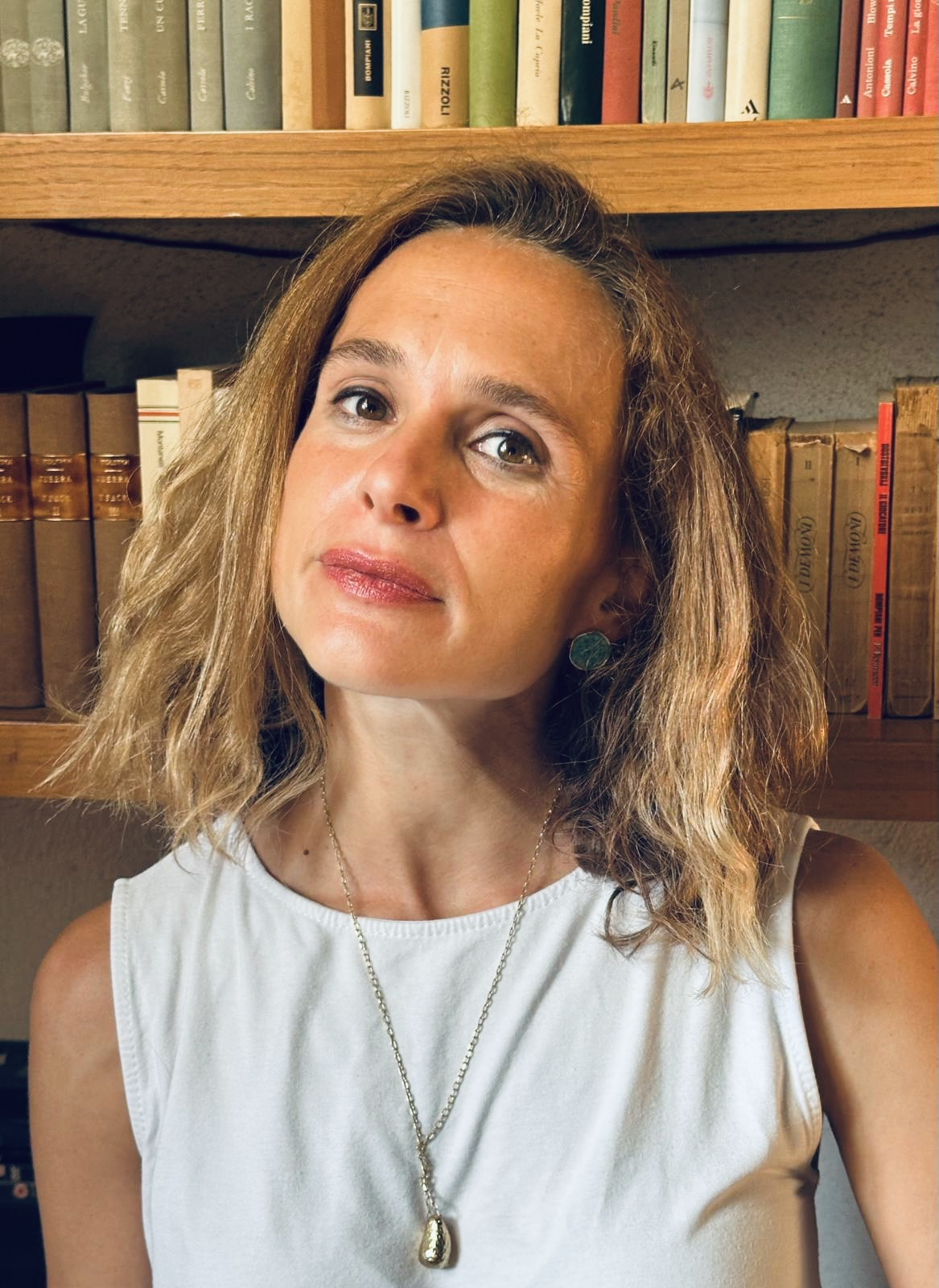
- Education: Sapienza University of Rome (BA, 2003; MA, 2005); University College London (MA, 2006; PhD, 2011)
- Occupation: Political philosopher
- Employer: University of Chicago
- Website: https://www.chiaracordelli.com/

Chiara Cordelli is an Italian philosopher and a professor in the Department of Political Science at the University of Chicago. Her work focuses on questions at the intersection of political philosophy and political economy, including the application of Kantian theory to the issues of philanthropy, privatization, and state legitimacy. Her first book, The Privatized State (2020), won the inaugural European Consortium for Political Research Political Theory Prize for best first English-language book of Political Theory. Her most recent work develops a critique of capitalism focused on its mode of investment and on social alienation.

== Ideas ==
Following Kant, Cordelli makes the argument that privatizing state services effectively marks a return to the "state of nature" wherein private interests are represented rather than the "omnilateral will." She argues that this "pre-civil" state of privatization lacks popular representation and loses its democratic legitimacy as a result.

== Reception ==
In his two-book review of The Privatized State and Hélène Landemore's Open Democracy, law professor Christopher Kutz praised Cordelli's book for its "profound critique" of the "neoliberal trend" of privatization, but suggested that Cordelli may place too much faith in public bureaucrats.

Likewise, philosophy professor Lisa Herzog admired the books's "brilliant discussion" of dignity and legitimacy, but had reservations about how the model was silent on what Herzog sees as "overdetermined" wrongs of privatization, as well as questions about how strongly the boundaries of Cordelli's argument hold up to scrutiny.
