= Scotland's Climate Assembly =

Citizens assembly on climate in Scotland

Scotland's Climate Assembly was a citizens' assembly held from 2020 - 2022 to deliberate how Scotland should tackle the climate crisis in an effective and fair way.

The establishment of a citizens’ assembly with a mandate to make climate recommendations to the Scottish Government was embedded in a 2019 amendment to the Climate Change (Scotland) Act 2009.

The assembly was formed of over 100 members broadly representative of Scotland in terms of age, gender, household income, ethnicity, geography, rurality, disability, and attitude towards climate change.
