= Citizens' assembly =

Randomly selected people to deliberate on public issues

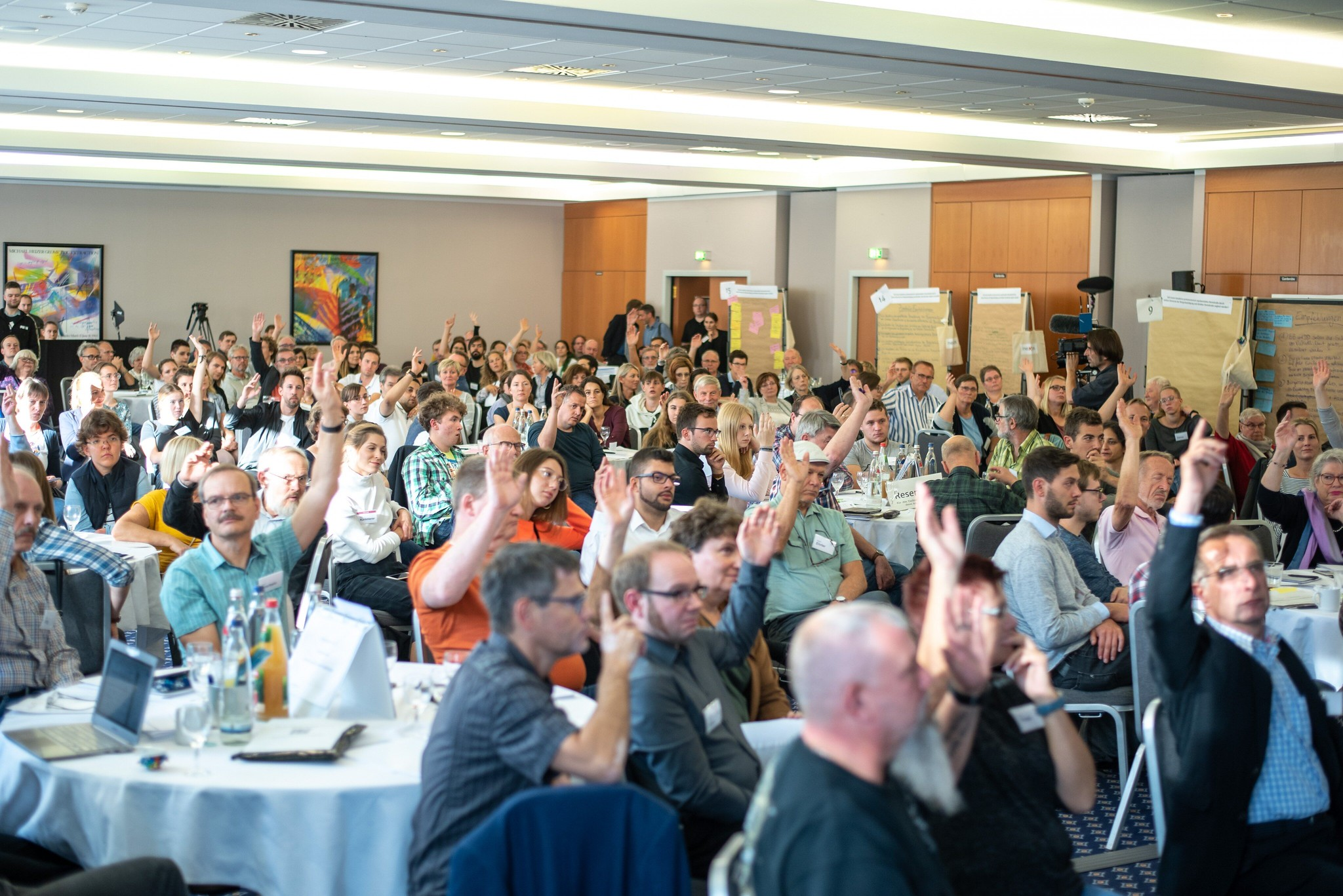
A session of a German citizens' assembly in 2019. The participants sit around tables for deliberation in small groups.

Citizens' assembly is a group of people selected by lottery from the general population to deliberate on important public questions so as to exert an influence. Other names and variations of deliberative mini-publics include citizens' jury, citizens' panel, people's panel, people's jury, policy jury, consensus conference and citizens' convention.

A citizens' assembly uses elements of a jury to create public policy. Its members form a representative cross-section of the public, and are provided with time, resources and a broad range of viewpoints to learn deeply about an issue. Through skilled facilitation, the assembly members weigh trade-offs and work to find common ground on a shared set of recommendations. Citizens' assemblies can be more representative and deliberative than public engagement, polls, legislatures or ballot initiatives. They seek quality of participation over quantity. They also have added advantages in issues where politicians have a conflict of interest, such as initiatives that will not show benefits before the next election or decisions that impact the types of income politicians can receive. They also are particularly well-suited to complex issues with trade-offs and values-driven dilemmas.

With Athenian democracy as the most famous government to use sortition, theorists and politicians have used citizens' assemblies and other forms of deliberative democracy in a variety of modern contexts. As of 2023, the international organization OECD has found their use increasing since 2010.

== Defining features ==
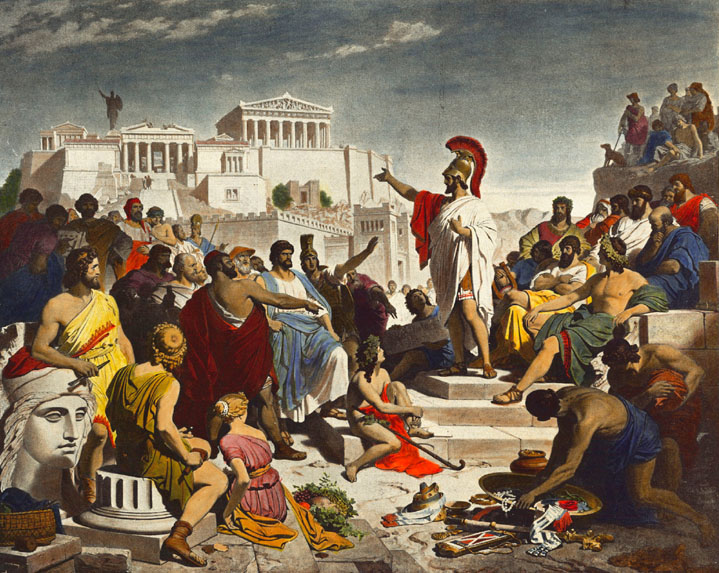
The Athenian democracy used sortition to determine various offices, although the assembly itself was not randomly selected.

=== Membership ===
Achieving a sufficiently inclusive and representative group of everyday people helps ensure that the assembly reflects political equality and the diversity of a community. Some of the components are described below.

==== Selection ====
Assembly members are most often selected through a two-stage process called sortition. In a first instance, a large number of invitations are sent from the convening authority at random (often around 10,000–30,000). The principle is that everybody should have an equal chance of being selected in the first place. Amongst those who respond positively to this invitation, there is a second lottery process, this time ensuring that the final group broadly reflects the community with regard to certain criteria such as gender, age, geographic, and socioeconomic status, amongst others. This is called stratification – a technique that is also used in opinion polls.

Random selection in governance (known as sortition) has historical significance and the earliest known instances include the Athenian democracy and various European communities.

==== Size ====
The size of a citizens' assembly should ideally be large enough to capture a representative cross-section of the population. The size depends on the purpose, demographics, and population size of the community. Assemblies typically consist of between 50 and 200 citizens.

==== Turnover ====
Regular turnover of participants is common. This can help to maintain viewpoint diversity in the long term and avoid sorting the assembly into in-groups and out-groups that could bias the result, become homogenous or get captured by private interests.

=== Functions ===
In general, the purpose is to have an influence on public decision making. The function of a citizens' assembly has no a priori limits. Though assemblies are sometimes limited in scope, the purpose of an assembly can vary widely. Modern assemblies have tended to propose rather than directly enact public policy changes due to constrictions in place by most constitutions. Assembly proposals in those systems are then enacted (or not) by the corresponding authority. Sometimes a proposal is sent to the general electorate as a referendum.

==== Deliberation ====
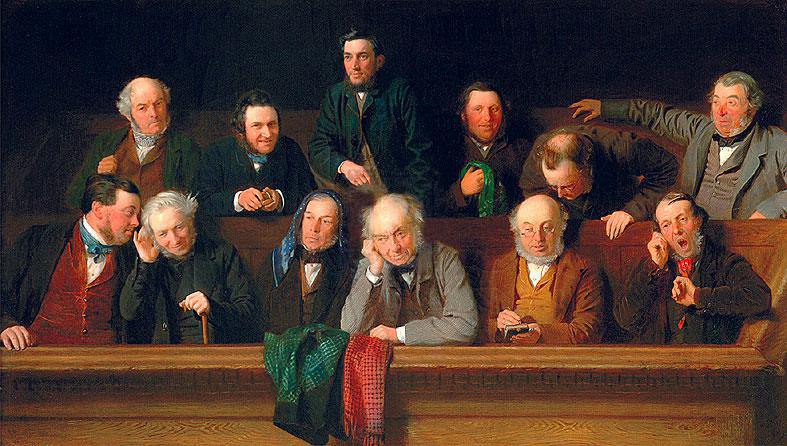
An 1861 painting of an English trial jury

A key component of assemblies is their deliberative nature. Deliberation allows members to reflect on their values and weigh new information in dialogue with subject-matter experts and their peers. By incorporating the views, information and arguments of experts and then asking the participants to engage in collaborative discussion, assemblies aim to enable the participants to educate themselves and produce a vote or result representative of the public interest. Chandler notes that while opinion polls can reveal what the public thinks more quickly and cheaply, citizens' assemblies can reveal "what they would reach after considered reflection."

Parkinson argues that the intent of deliberation is to "replace power plays and political tantrums with 'the mild voice of reason'". Deliberation attempts to marry procedural effectiveness with substantive outcomes. Parkinson continues that the process reframes "political legitimacy" as involving "not just doing things right, but doing the right things". This view contrasts with the purely procedural account of legitimacy, of which Rawls says "there is a correct or fair procedure such that the outcome is likewise correct or fair, whatever it is, provided the procedure has been followed properly." While deliberation is itself a procedure, it deliberately incorporates factual information, and thus broadens the consideration of legitimacy.

==== Agenda-setting ====
Agenda-setting refers to establishing a plan for the substantive issues that the assembly is to consider. In major examples of assemblies, such as those in British Columbia and Ontario, the legislature set the agenda before the assemblies were convened. However, Dahl asserts that final control over agendas is an essential component of an ideal democracy: "the body of citizens...should have the exclusive control to determine what matters are or are not to be decided." Today, agenda-setting is a component of the ongoing citizens' assemblies in Ostbelgien (the German-Speaking Community of Belgium), Paris, and the Brussels Citizens' Assembly on Climate.

==== Briefing materials ====
Briefing materials should be balanced, diverse and accurate. One approach is to have an advisory committee of randomly selected from the population to set the rules and procedures without undue influence by government officials.

==== Guardrails ====
Especially when juries or assemblies have more than advisory powers, the checks and balances grow to ensure that those participating cannot make unilateral decisions or concentrate power. In Athenian democracy, for example, this meant a complex array of carrots and sticks as guardrails that successfully blunted the temptation of corruption. Étienne Chouard argues that in large part because elected politicians wrote the constitutions, that governments that use elections have far fewer guardrails in place than those based largely on sortition.

Some worry that assemblies might not provide the same accountability as elections to prevent members from engaging in inappropriate behavior. Pierre Étienne Vandamme points to other methods of accountability (including from separate citizens' assemblies) and the benefits of being able to vote one's conscience and not being subject to the same external pressures as elected politicians. Assemblies can also provide a check on elected officials by setting and enforcing the rules governing them, instead of politicians self-policing.

==== Decision ====
At some point, the assembly concludes its deliberations and offers conclusions and recommendations. This is typically done in a voting process such as through the use of secret ballots to help keep citizens from becoming public figures and able to vote their conscience.

==== Application ====
Étienne Chouard argues that elected officials have a conflict of interest when it comes to creating the rules by which power is distributed in a democracy, such as in drafting constitutions. He argues for sortition (e.g. citizens' assemblies) as ideal for this type of decision-making. An OECD report also argues that issues whose benefits may not be felt before the next election cycle are especially suited for deliberative mini-publics.

Andrew Anthony believes citizens' assemblies would be useful for specific cases, but worries that with more complex issues that juries (or in this case assemblies) would not outperform elected officials. Jamie Susskind disagrees, arguing that complex issues with real trade-offs are better for a deliberative body of citizens than leaving it to political or industrial elites. He also argues that values-driven dilemmas represent a particularly good opportunity for deliberative mini-publics.

== Precursors ==
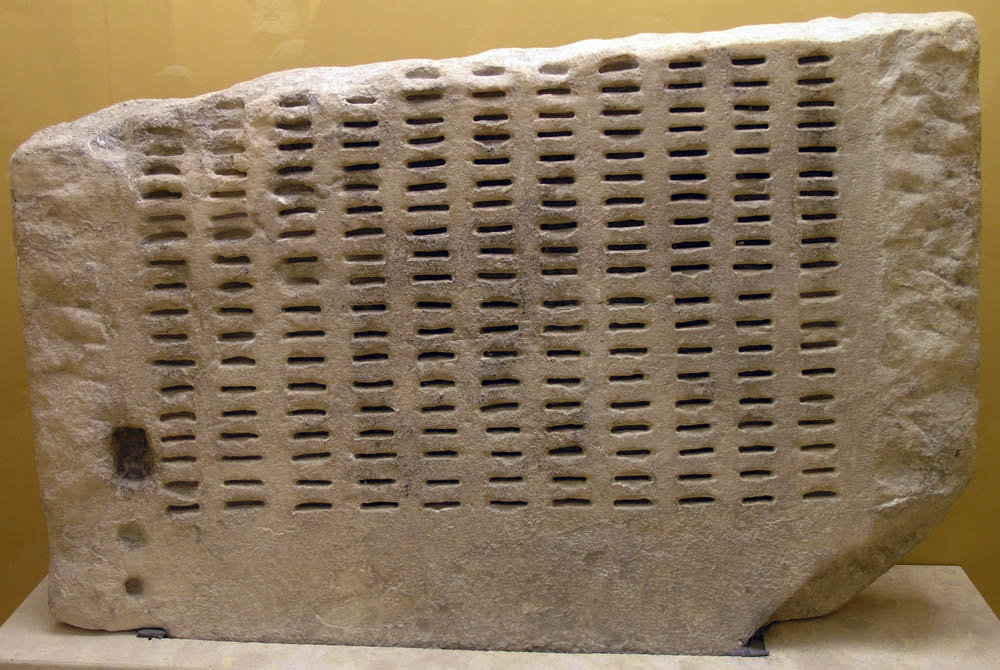
A kleroterion in the Ancient Agora Museum (Athens)

Several historical states are known to use sortition, though unlike the modern concept of a citizens' assembly in that it was principally used to determine offices, rather than policies.

The most famous example is Athenian democracy, in which sortition was utilized to pick most of the magistrates for their governing committees, and for their juries (typically of 501 men). Most Athenians believed sortition, not elections, to be democratic and used complex procedures with purpose-built allotment machines (kleroteria) to avoid the corrupt practices used by oligarchs to buy their way into office. According to the author Mogens Herman Hansen, the citizens' court was superior to the assembly because the allotted members swore an oath which ordinary citizens in the assembly did not; therefore, the court could annul the decisions of the assembly. Most Greek writers who mention democracy (including Aristotle, (Note: Aristotle, Politics 1301a28-35) (Note: Aristotle, Politics 4.1294be) Plato, (Note: Plato, Republic VIII, 557a) Herodotus, (Note: Herodotus The Histories 3.80.6) and Pericles (Note: Thucydides, The Peloponnesian War. The Funeral Oration of Pericles.)) emphasize the role of selection by lot, or state outright that being allotted is more democratic than elections (which were seen as oligarchic).

From the 12th to the 18th century, Italian republics used sortition as part of their method of appointing political offices, including city states of Lombardy during the 12th and 13th centuries, Venice until the late 18th century, and Florence in the 14th and 15th centuries. As with Athenian democracy, it was used together with other methods such as voting to determine offices. Italy is not the only place where sortition is documented in the early modern period. Some parts of Switzerland used random selection during the years between 1640 and 1837 to prevent corruption.

Trial juries are another precursor to citizens' assemblies. Juries had been a standard feature of the English legal system since the mid-12th century, building on earlier traditions. Early juries differed from a modern trial jury on two counts: they were appointed by local sheriff rather than sortition and they were expected to investigate the facts before the trial. Over time, the jury developed its modern characteristics. In 1730, the British Parliament passed the Bill for Better Regulation of Juries which introduced sortition by lot as the method of selection, though full randomisation would not be secured until the 20th century.

During the Age of Enlightenment, many of the political ideals originally championed by the democratic city-states of ancient Greece were revisited. The use of sortition as a means of selecting the members of government while receiving praise from notable Enlightenment thinkers such as Montesquieu in his book The Spirit of Laws, and Harrington, for his ideal republic of Oceana. Rousseau argued for a mixed model of sortition and election, whereas Edmund Burke worried that those randomly selected to serve would be less effective and productive than self-selected politicians. (Note: Edmund Burke (1790), Reflections on the Revolution in France)

Despite this, there was almost no discussion of sortition during the formation of the American and French republics. Bernard Manin, a French political theorist, argues that this paradoxical lack of attention may have been because choosing rulers by lot may have been viewed as impractical on such a large scale as the modern state, or if elections were thought to give greater political consent than sortition. David Van Reybrouck instead argues that, besides their relatively limited knowledge about Athenian democracy, wealthy Enlightenment figures preferred using elections as it allowed them to retain more power as an aristocracy that was elected instead of hereditary.

== Modern examples ==
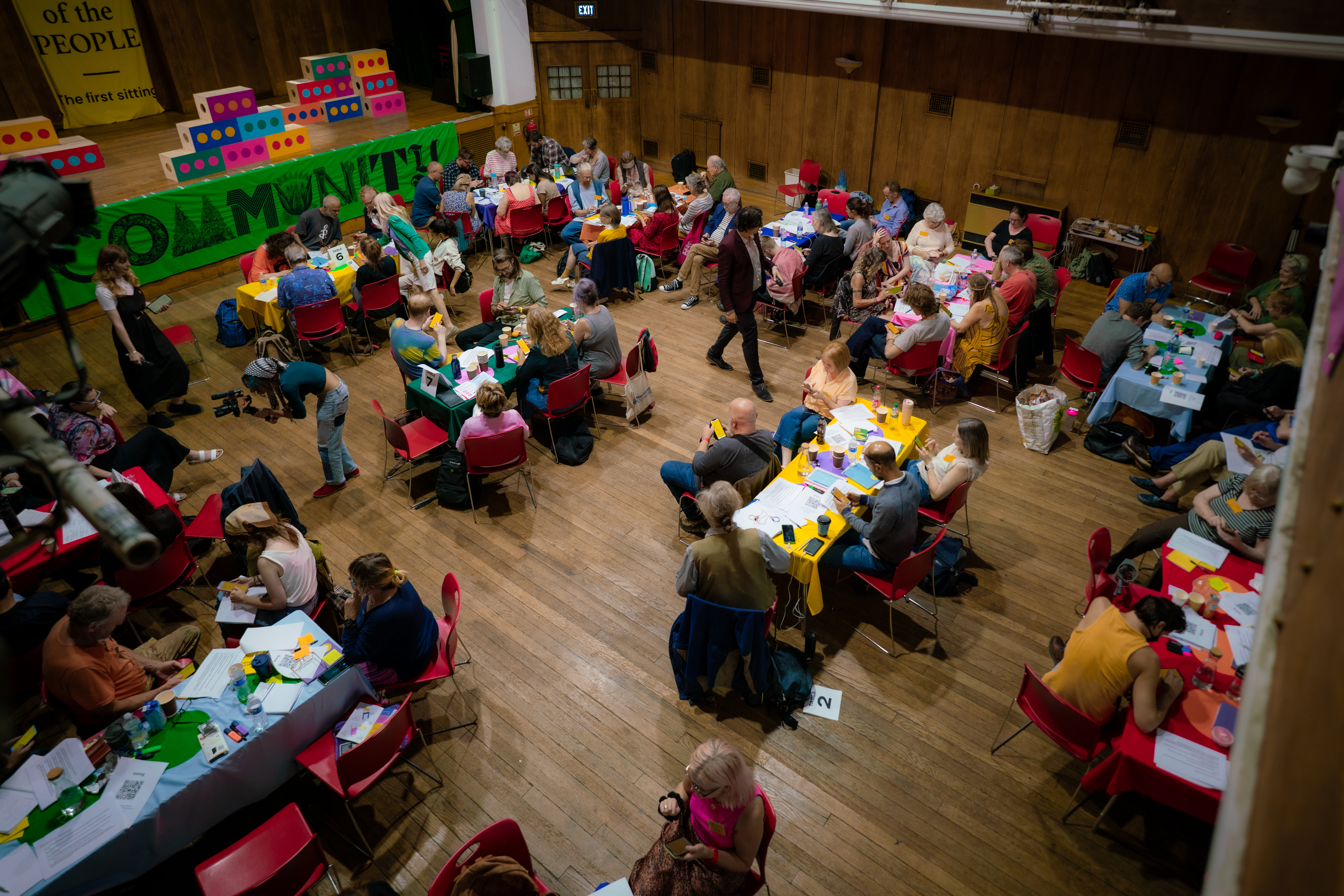
A citizens' assembly organised by a British campaign group in 2025.

Assemblies in modern times mostly send recommendations to politicians or voters for approval. For randomly selected bodies with decision-making power, some examples can be found in ancient Athens, the Republic of Venice, the Republic of Florence and juries in the United States. The OECD identified 733 assemblies from 1979 to 2023. The OECD also documented the growth of permanent assemblies starting in 2010. Claudia Chwalisz discusses eight ways that deliberative democracy has been institutionalised.

=== Global Assembly ===
The Global Assembly was organized in 2021 to coincide with the COP26 in Glasgow in October–November 2021. It is the first body that has attempted to make a claim to represent the democratic wishes of the global population as a whole.

=== Australia ===
After six world cafés in 2008, a national Australian Citizens' Parliament was held over four days in February 2009. Building on Australia's history of democratic innovations, it used stratified random sampling from each electorate, featured an online stage, and allowed the 150 participants to reflect on their own agenda and recommendations.

=== Belgium ===
The G1000 is a donation-funded initiative launched in 2011 by David Van Reybrouck with an online survey to identify issues. 700 participants came together for a day to deliberate in Brussels.

==== First modern permanent assembly ====
In September 2019, the German-speaking region in Belgium launched the first ongoing citizens' assembly since the renaissance. The body shares powers in the legislature with an elected body. The citizens' assembly has two bodies: the Bürgerrat meets monthly and has 24 members serving for 18 months and they set the agenda for another randomly selected body of less than 50 people who decide on issues during 3 weekends over 3 months. Brussels and Wallonia have since created permanent advisory citizens' assemblies.

=== Canada ===
Pioneering citizens' assemblies proposed changes to the electoral systems of British Columbia in 2004 and Ontario in 2006. While the recommendations of these assemblies did not garner the 60% of votes necessary in follow-up referendums, they inspired more deliberative assemblies in Canada and around the world, even helping to popularize the term "citizens' assembly".

=== Denmark ===
Johs Grundahl discusses Denmark as a major hot spot of consensus conferences in the 1980s and one of the earliest attempts by policymakers to include the lay public's opinions in their decision-making through public engagement. The purpose of consensus conferences is to "qualify people's attitudes, inasmuch as they are given all the information they require until they are ready to assess a given technology" and the resulting product may look different from that of other types of assemblies due to the need to reach consensus. Consensus conferences are generally deemed suitable for topics that are socially relevant and/or that require public support.

Participants are randomly selected from a group of citizens who are invited to apply. Invitees are members of the lay public who have no specific knowledge of the issue. The resulting panel attempts to be demographically representative.

Panel members participate in two preparatory weekends and are given material prepared by a communicator to gain a basic understanding of the topic. The panel then participates in a 4-day conference. The panel participates in a Q&A session with experts, where they hear opposing views. Members then prepare a final document summarizing their views and recommendations. On the final day, the panel then discusses their final document with policy- and decision-makers.

=== France ===
France hosted a Citizens Convention on Climate in 2019 and 2020, where 150 randomly selected citizens made recommendations to elected officials on environmental policies.

France hosted another convention on the end of life concerning assisted suicide and euthanasia in 2022 and 2023 to advise the French parliament in coordination with a consultative legislative assembly, which some worry will dilute the process. This process had 170 participants.

=== Germany ===
Since the 1980s, local and regional governments in Germany increasingly experimented with consultative bodies drawn from randomly selected citizens. One of the variations that originated in Germany and has inspired similar experiments elsewhere is known as planning cells, where one or more cohorts of randomly selected citizens go through a process of hearing from speakers and deliberating on an issue in order to efficiently get more representative and deliberative input from a population.

=== Ireland ===
After the Irish financial crisis beginning in 2008, an assembly was among various proposals for political reform. The subsequent Fine Gael–Labour government's programme included a "Constitutional Convention" comprising a chairperson nominated by the Taoiseach, 33 legislators nominated by political parties, and 67 citizens selected to be demographically representative. It met from 2012 to 2014, discussing six issues specified by the government and then two assembly-selected issues. It issued nine reports, recommending constitutional amendments and other changes to statute law and legislative practice. The government put two of the eighteen proposals that needed a referendum on the 2015 ballot, while some of the others were able to be implemented. The 2015 Irish Constitutional Referendums saw gay marriage legalized.

The Fine Gael–independent minority government formed after the 2016 general election established an assembly in July 2016 "without participation by politicians, and with a mandate to look at a limited number of key issues over an extended time period".

=== Netherlands ===
Held in 2006 and composed of 143 randomly selected Dutch citizens, the Burgerforum Kiesstelsel was tasked with examining options for electoral reform. On December 14, 2006, the Burgerforum presented its final report to a minister of the outgoing People's Party (VVD). A response to the report was delivered in April 2008, when it was rejected by the government of the then-ruling coalition.

Tegen Verkiezingen has maintained a list of news articles related to citizens' assemblies and sortition in the Netherlands since 2018.

=== Poland ===
Beginning in July 2016 after the municipal response to flooding was deemed inadequate by many citizens, Gdańsk assemblies comprising approximately 60 randomly selected residents from the city's voter rolls made binding decisions to address problems. The membership was then balanced according to factors such as education-level, age, sex and district. For example, the assembly has the same percentage of senior citizens as the city. The assembly met for several days, heard testimony from experts, asked questions and deliberated in small groups before rendering its decisions. Assembly meetings were described by some as calm and enjoyable.

=== Ukraine ===
There have been two citizens' assemblies in Ukraine, held in the municipalities of Zvyahel and Slavutych from October to November 2024 over three weekends, each with around 45 participants. The topic of the Zvyahel Assembly focused on "Creating urban spaces as public locations for social interaction and recovery" and in Slavutych it was "How can we improve the household waste management system in our community?" The Assemblies were organised by their city councils, with support from the Council of Europe.

=== United Kingdom ===
The People's Parliament was a television program run in 1994 that showed randomly selected members of the British public debating policy topics. The idea came from James S. Fishkin, who acted as a consultant to the program. According to The Economist, "many viewers of the 'People's Parliament' have judged its debates to be of higher quality than those in the House of Commons. Members of the former, unlike the latter, appear to listen to what their fellows say."

In 2019, six parliamentary select committees announced the UK Climate Assembly, with 108 citizens aiming to deliberate over how to reach net-zero emissions by 2050. Meetings were delayed due to the COVID-19 pandemic and took place over six weekends between January and May 2020, with a report published in September 2020.

Similarly, Scotland's Climate Assembly was held over the course of eight meetings from November 2020 to February of 2022 with the goal of determining how Scotland could most fairly and effectively tackle the climate crisis. The assembly then presented recommendations to the Scottish government in 2022.

The Citizens' Assembly of Scotland met in 2019 and 2020 to discuss very broad themes, which some academics said led to less tangible outcomes than other assemblies but an impressive report and equally successful coordination online. In 2021, Newham London Borough Council became the first local authority to introduce a citizens' assembly as a permanent body, with rotating members.

In a 2019 survey of British citizens by the Royal Society of Arts, 57% of those surveyed thought that a citizens' assembly would not be sufficiently democratic because it was not large enough. Northern Ireland had the highest support for an assembly, which the authors speculated was perhaps due to the use of assemblies in the Republic of Ireland.

The Beyond Politics party has called for assemblies to be utilized for direct decision-making in the UK. In 2023, the Labour Party said it was drawing up plans to introduce citizens' assemblies inspired by the assemblies in the Republic of Ireland should it enter government. It has been suggested by the party that the assemblies could give the public a say on issues such as devolution, assisted dying, house building and constitutional reform, among others. The party has also suggested that these assemblies could override the government on issues for which they come to a decision.

=== United States ===
==== Oregon ====
A Citizens' Initiative Review (CIR) is a panel that deliberates on a ballot initiative or referendum to be decided in an upcoming election in order to produce a useful summary for voters. The panelists are chosen through means such as random sampling and stratified sampling to be demographically representative. This often involves paying for the time and travel of the roughly two dozen participants. While not quite a citizens' assembly according to John Rountree and Nicole Curato, they note it shares many of the same characteristics.

The state of Oregon created the first permanent Citizens' Initiative Review in 2010, while pilots have been run in places including Colorado, Arizona, Massachusetts, and Sion (Switzerland).

==== Texas ====
In the late 1990s, Texas power companies tapped then University of Texas professor James Fishkin to run an intensive form of poll (known as a deliberative poll), where representative samples of ratepayers (customers) were selected to join eight sessions where they could learn about and deliberate on whether they would want to, for example, pay $2 to $5 per month more for their energy bills in order to get more energy from wind power and improve energy efficiency. The dramatic rise in ratepayers willing to pay more after the eight sessions has received much credit for motivating Texas' wind power boom.

==== Connecticut ====
In 2026, the Connecticut Office of the Comptroller collaborated with the University of Connecticut and Yale University to conduct a one-time, 100-person citizens' assembly. The group met to formulate and provide recommendations to the state legislature on property tax and municipal funding policy. The group was semi-randomly chosen from Connecticut residents in such as a way as to best represent the demographics of state. They met in New Haven at Yale for six sessions from July to September, and were given self-governance in regards to researching, presenting, and approving recommendations. Professors from the collaborating universities were available to provide advice on law and policy to the members of the Assembly. In total, the Assembly approved ten recommendations for the legislature, ranging from encouraging consolidation of municipal services to a millionaires' tax. State Comptroller Sean Scanlon presented the group's findings to the legislature on 26 October 2026.

== Outcomes ==
=== Common interest and polarization ===
Electoral reform, redistricting, campaign finance law, and the regulation of political speech are often claimed to be unsuitable for management by self-interested politicians. Assemblies have repeatedly been deployed to replace such political judgments. Fearon and separately Nino support the idea that deliberative democratic models tend to generate conditions of impartiality, rationality and knowledge, increasing the likelihood that the decisions reached are morally correct.

Peter Stone, Oliver Dowlen and Gil Delannoi assert that selection by sortition prevents disproportionate influence by "special interests". Term limits could further reduce the opportunities for special interests to influence assemblies.

Lawrence Lessig argues that assemblies can help unwind political polarization.

=== Deliberation ===
Deliberative democracy aims to harness the benefits of deliberation to produce better understanding and resolution of important issues. Assemblies are intended to stimulate deliberation, in which the participants can less easily be captured by special interest. Deliberative polling advocate Fishkin claimed that deliberation promotes better problem-solving by educating and actively engaging participants. Deliberation is claimed to lessen factionalism by emphasizing resolution over partisanship. Additionally, citizens who were not selected tend to perceive those chosen as both technical experts and as "ordinary" citizens like themselves. As happened in British Columbia, these features encouraged voter comfort with the actions of the assembly. For example, a study comparing the debate quality of an Irish Citizens' Assembly and an Irish parliamentary committee found that citizens showed a deeper cognitive grasp of the subject matter at stake (abortion).

Consensus conferences have the potential to make individuals tend to the extreme in their opinions, i.e. citizens essentially rally around their own views in the presence of opposing views. However, Fishkin responded that this depends on how the assembly is structured. Resources such as briefing materials and expert testimony are meant to ameliorate extreme views by supplying information and correcting misinformation/misunderstanding.

=== Representative and inclusive ===
Random lotteries have been explored as election alternatives on grounds that it allows for more accurate representation and inclusivity. A truly randomly selected group can embody the "median voter". Participants are supposed to represent the common person. Selection by lot can correct the unrepresentativeness of many elections. Successful political candidates typically require access to education, money and connections. Though elected legislators generally have more experience, they are likely to focus on their supporters rather than the larger population. Representative democracies have been criticized as not representative at all. The lack of female and minority representation in the US Congress is often cited as an example. Others lament the importance of branding in electing candidates (with recognizable last names, for example, fueling political dynasties).

Money is argued to have an outsized role in election outcomes. Lessig argued that elections are dominated by money. When random selection is used alongside statistical analysis, accurate representation can be attained, although in practice, a large number of citizens' assemblies do not reach a sample size large enough to achieve statistical representativeness. Overlaying quotas on the initial random selection corrects for disproportionate ability/willingness across various groups, improving representativeness.

==== Cognitive diversity ====
Assemblies allow for increased cognitive diversity, understood as a diversity of problem-solving methods or ways of interpreting the world. Quasi-random selection does not filter out cognitive diversity as elections are alleged to do. Similarly, the process does not attempt to select the best-performing or most skilled agents.

Some studies report that cognitively diverse groups produce better results than homogenous groups, a phenomenon commonly referred to as the wisdom of the crowd. Lu and Page claim that cognitive diversity is valuable for effective problem solving. They selected two problem-solving teams from a diverse population of intelligent agents: the randomly selected team outperformed the "best-performing" agents. Unique perspectives and interpretations generally enhance analysis. These results imply that it may be more important to maximize cognitive diversity over individual competence. Landemore argued that random selection results in increased efficacy, diversity and inclusivity. In fact, Mill famously argued that governing assemblies should be a "fair sample of every grade of intellect among the people" over "a selection of the greatest political minds". This analysis contrasts with those concerned about competence of individuals selected.

==== Representativeness ====
While sortition can enable a more representative group and outcome than through elections, that outcome is not guaranteed. James Fishkin argues that some important ways to improve representativeness include reducing time burdens, requiring employers to give employees time off if needed, and adding remote options while increasing the benefits in terms of pay and power that is given to an assembly.

Dietram Scheufele worried in 2010 that the selected individuals with the time and interest to join civic meetings like consensus conferences often results in an unrepresentative survey sample, especially if most of those invited do not choose to participate.^{:16-19} He also cites concern around participant group dynamics and how personalities have played an important role in producing different outcomes of discussions in experiments in the 1990s.^{:19, 24}

=== Efficiency ===
Instead of asking all citizens to deliberate deeply on every issue every election, assemblies/juries might save voters time by only asking for short bursts of their time and attention on one specific issue instead of more frequent elections or long ballots associated with voter fatigue. The biggest potential for cost-savings stems from the wisdom of the crowd that could be less susceptible to forms of influence by special interests seeking narrow benefits at the expense of the rest. John Burnheim critiques representative democracy as requiring citizens to vote for a large package of policies and preferences bundled together in one representative or party, much of which a voter might not want. He argues that this does not efficiently translate voter preferences as well as sortition, where a group of people have the time and the ability to focus on a single issue.

=== Participation ===
Compared to elections, assemblies may trade shallow participation by voting on many issues for deeper participation on fewer issues. When people vote, they interact with the government and with the law.

Some argue that elections and voting represent for some an important element of sovereignty, even if the vote makes little difference, and that eliminating elections undermines the consultation process that allows those voters to feel like a more involved citizen in a representative democracy. Daniel Chandler, for example, argues that "on its own, random selection would leave most people with no way of participating in the formal decision-making", which could lead to public disengagement with politics. Lafont argues that assemblies undermine deliberation. She argues that this is because assemblies asking the public to accept the results of their deliberation is akin to an elite democracy. While she clarifies that "this variety differs from the standard elite model to the extent that it does not ask citizens to blindly defer to the deliberations of a consolidated political elite.... [it] blindly defer to the deliberations of a few selected citizens." Fishkin argues in turn that this model is not elite because it uses ordinary citizens who are representative of the population. Lafont rejects this characterization, arguing that people are "subjected to a filter of deliberative experience" which makes them "no longer a representative sample of the citizenry at large".

Landemore responds to Lafont by arguing that while her concerns are valid, large-scale discourse is simply impossible, never mind superior. Landemore recommends making assemblies "as 'open' to the larger public as possible". For example, their decisions could be validated via a referendum. Susskind argues that mini-publics are a more legitimate form of democracy than legislatures, because the decisions are made by fellow citizens and not political elites.

Fishkin notes a trilemma among the ideas of political equality, deliberation, and participation. In a body such as an assembly, political equality is achieved through a random and ideally representative selection process, while deliberation is achieved in the actions of the assembly. However, since the body is made up of a subset of the population, it does not achieve the goal of participation on a broad scale. Fishkin attempts to solve that trilemma by considering an entire deliberative society, which would constitute a deliberative macrocosm. He sees assemblies as experiments on how to realize macro-scale deliberation later on. Chandler argues that citizens' assemblies should not replace elections but instead have an advisory or hybrid role; he discusses a more radical proposal that one could be a permanent legislative chamber.

Warren and Gastil claim, in the British Columbia case, that other citizens should have been able to "treat it as a facilitative trustee (a trusted information and decision proxy)". Participants essentially became informal experts, allowing them to act as an extension of the larger public. The introduction of the assembly, according to John Parkinson, undermined the trust and power that British Columbia political parties and advocacy groups had gained. It could also "undermine the epistemic, ethical, and democratic functions of the whole".

== See also ==
- Direct democracy
- Egalitarianism
- Informed consent
- Participatory democracy
