= Citizens Convention for Climate =

French citizens' assembly looking at reducing emissions

Citizens Convention for Climate logo

The Citizens Convention for Climate is a citizens' assembly held in 2019 and 2020 which discussed reducing France's carbon emissions by 40% from its 1990 levels in a spirit of social justice. It was initiated in response to the Yellow Vest protests to the fuel tax. The convention was modeled after a number of other deliberative experiments known as deliberative mini-publics. The members of the convention were 150 randomly selected citizens designed to be representative of the French public across six demographic dimensions: gender, age, socio-economic background, education level, location type, and province. The convention was assisted by a number of committees including the governance committee, a team of experts who provided organizational guidance and assistance, a guarantor college, which maintained the convention's independence, and a legal board. The members themselves divided into working groups on five issues within the topic of climate change: food, housing, employment, transportation, and consumption.

The work of the convention was initially split into six sessions, with an additional official seventh session and three unofficial sessions: two virtual sessions in between the sixth and seventh session and an eighth session to evaluate the government's proposed climate bill. The sessions were initially held every third weekend beginning the weekend of October 5, 2019. The fourth session was delayed by the pension protests in December 2019 and January 2020 and the seventh session was delayed by the COVID-19 pandemic. The first session focused on defining the role of the assembly, the second session focused on the biggest questions the convention would attempt to answer, the third session involved many meetings with outside experts, and the fourth session involved work within the five working groups and a visit from Emmanuel Macron. The members finalized their proposals during the fifth session, presented them during the sixth session, and voted on them in the seventh session. In total, the convention approved of 149 proposals across the working groups, of which Emmanuel Macron promised to implement 146.

The media reported an increasingly strained relationship between the members of the convention and parliament as the members of the convention felt that parliament was failing to pass their initiatives and be sufficiently bold in their proposals. When parliament announced the bill written in response to the proposals of the convention, many members of the convention were outraged that it did not include many of their key provisions. During the unofficial eighth session, many members of the convention gave parliament a failing grade for its inability to enact their proposals.

The convention attracted significant attention from scholars, particularly scholars of deliberative and participatory democracy. There is a growing body of literature written by democratic theorists, many of whom observed the convention in person, on what the convention means for the future of democracy and evaluating the successes and failures of the convention.

== Formation ==
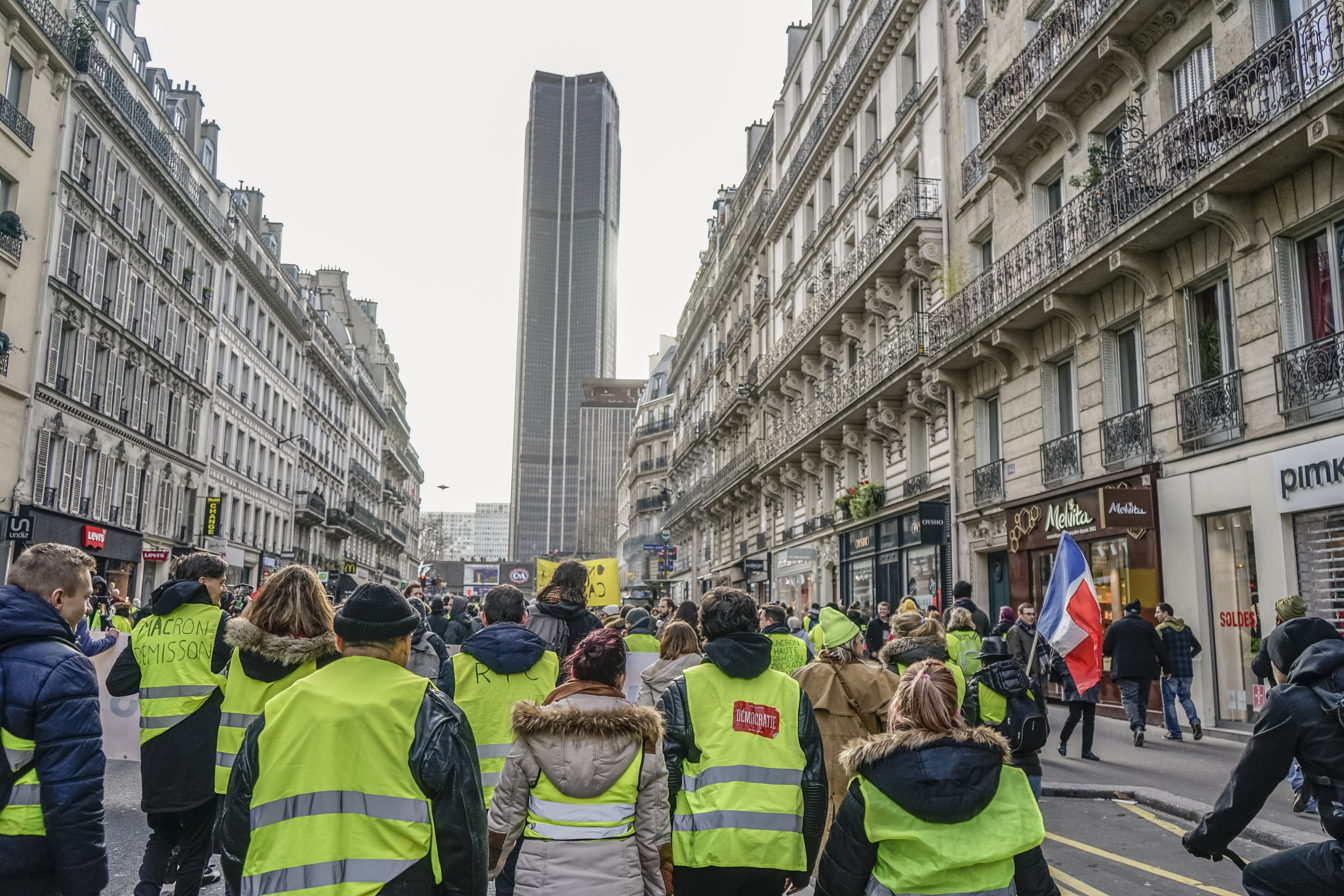
Yellow Vest protesters

On April 25, 2019, President Emmanuel Macron announced the creation of the Citizens Convention for Climate in a press conference. The stated purpose was to reduce greenhouse gas emissions by 40% from their level in 1990 in accordance with social justice. The convention was a response to the wider Yellow Vest protest movement and as an extension of the French "Grand Débat National", organized in response to it. In particular, the convention was a response to the protests against the fuel tax and the decreased speed limit, which the Yellow Vest protesters viewed as unfair to the poor, and it was hoped that the convention would be able to resolve the tensions around the tax or propose alternative measures.

On July 2, 2019, Prime Minister Edouard Philippe addressed a "letter of mission" that formally announced the convention to the president of the Economical, Social and Environmental Council (CESE), the organization tasked with organizing the convention. This letter describes the organization of the convention and the independence of its governance committee. Philippe also stated that the proposals of the convention would be submitted to the President without filter.

== Theory ==
The Citizens Convention for Climate is an example of a deliberative mini-public. Mini-publics are bodies chosen from the general public by random selection, also known as sortition. Juries, planning cells, consensus conferences, and deliberative polls are all examples of mini-publics. The Citizens Convention for Climate is a specific type of mini-public known as a citizens' assembly, a mini-public in which randomly selected members of the public are given legislative power as representatives of the general public, either formal or advisory, in a specific issue area or a group of issue areas.

Citizens' assemblies are designed to be representative of the diversity of the entire population. The members of the convention had varying opinions on whether they believed themselves to be representatives of the public. During the first session, 43 of the 123 members who answered a survey believed that they spoke only for themselves, 25 said they spoke for themselves and people like themselves, 24 said they spoke in the name of causes they cared about, and 3 in the name of other groups. Individual members of the convention gave more specific accounts. When asked, a 30-year-old man said that he was "trying" to be a representative while a 17-year-old high school student said "It's a little arrogant to say that [I'm representing the youth] but I'm trying to represent them. Not everybody has the chance to be selected." Another member of the convention said to Hélène Landemore, a democratic theorist and observer of the convention, "When I say I represent the youth, I mean me, the others [other young members of the convention], ... saying what they [the French youth] think, being their loudspeaker, acting for them."

Mini-publics have been growing in popularity in recent years, particularly in order to solve climate change. In 2004, British Columbia held a citizens' assembly, called the British Columbia Citizens' Assembly, in order to decide how to amend voting rules in the province. Ireland has held several citizens assemblies since 2010 to address questions such as the legalization of abortion, same-sex marriage, and climate change. At the same time as the French Citizens' Convention, the United Kingdom also held a citizens' assembly on climate change. Washington state is holding a citizens' assembly, which began in January 2021, and there have been proposals to solve a number of issues with help from citizens' assemblies such as COVID-19 and democratic reform. The citizens' convention was also, in part, inspired by consensus conventions on technology, featured most prominently in Denmark which has had 22 such conferences since 1998. These conferences also bring together a representative group of citizens to deliberate on an issue. In these conferences, the citizens write a report on what issues unite the participants and where they were able to find consensus.

== Membership ==
=== Sortition ===
The 150 members of the Citizens' Assembly on Climate were chosen randomly using sortition in order to produce a representative sample of the French population. Initially, the organizers randomly selected 250,000 phone numbers. They then texted each selected number to request permission to call about the convention. If granted permission, they called to collect demographic information. Next, quota sampling, a statistical technique used to create a sample with specified demographic composition, was applied using the data collected from the phone calls in order to ensure a representative sample of the population across six demographic lines: gender, age, socio-economic status, education level, location (urban vs rural), and region. Notably, race and religion were not factors in the decision as the French government is barred from asking citizens to disclose their race or religion. From this process, 190 citizens were selected, with 40 of them serving as substitutes.

The use of quota sampling to ensure proportionality is not uniform across citizens' assemblies. For example, the British Columbia Citizens' Assembly only adjusted for sex and geographic district. Ensuring representation across other demographics was left to the discretion of the assembly's chair, who added two indigenous Canadians to ensure their representation. In recent years, citizens assemblies have ensured representation across more demographics. For example, the Climate Assembly of the United Kingdom (CAUK) employed seven demographic criteria while the Irish Citizens' Assembly used four.

Researchers have examined the sample of the population beyond the initial six categories covered by the quota sampling. There were many similarities between the French population and the members of the convention, notably among most cultural values, satisfaction with the media, satisfaction with life, and the desire for a high standard of living. There were also some key differences. The members of the convention were generally more trusting of others and more confident in citizens' abilities to deliberate. They were more in favor of redistribution and associative action, but also stronger believers in diligence and hard work. They placed a lower value on individual expression and a stronger value on obedience while valuing the development of critical thinking more than discipline. Regarding the environment, they were more likely than the general public to say that climate change is principally caused by humans, but the general public was more likely to say that it was entirely caused by humans. The members were also more likely to value environmental protections and believe that environmental degradation was caused by climate change, but they were more likely to believe that there was a chance to limit it. Members of the convention were more supportive of action against climate change and saw lobbies as the biggest threat against future action.

=== Demographics ===
The sortition and quota sampling produced the following demographic breakdown. The composition refers to the demographic breakdown reported at the start of the assembly, while the participants include the 159 and 160 people who participated in sessions 1 and 7, respectively, regardless of whether or not they were one of the 150 citizens selected. As a result, it includes the experts who advised on each session. The French population refers to the official demographic breakdown of the entire French population.

Gender Breakdown
Gender	Composition of Convention	Participants of Session 1	Participants of Session 7	French Population
Female	51%	49.1%	48.1%	47.8%
Male	49%	50.9%	51.9	52.2%

Age Breakdown
Age Range	Composition of Convention	Participants of Session 1	Participants of Session 7	French Population
16-17	3%	3.1%	4.4%	3.0%
18-24	11%	9.4%	8.8%	10.6%
25-34	14%	16.4%	15.0%	15.3%
35-39	24%	21.4%	21.9%	25.3%
50-64	28%	30.2%	31.9%	24.1%
65+	18%	19.5%	18.1%	21.8%

Socio-Economic Breakdown
Socio-Economic Group	Composition of Convention	Participants of Session 1	Participants of Session 7	French Population
Farmers	1%	1.3%	0.6%	0.9%
Artisans	4%	3.8%	4.4%	3.5%
Executives and Managers	9%	13.8%	13.8%	9.2%
Technicians and Professional Employees	16%	17.0%	15.0%	14.3%
Clerks and Skilled Employees	16%	12.6%	14.4%	16.8%
Industrial Employees	10%	8.2%	9.4%	13.3%
Retired	27%	27.0%	26.3%	27.2%
Unemployed	18%	16.4%	16.3%	14.9%

Educational Breakdown
Highest Level of Education	Composition of Convention	Participants of Session 1	Participants of Session 7	French Population
No Diploma	26%	23.9%	25.0%	27.6%
Pre-Baccalaureat	21%	17.0%	18.8%	22.0%
Baccalaureat	19%	18.9%	17.5%	15.1%
Greater than Baccalaureat	21%	28.3%	26.3%	25.9%
Current Student	13%	12.0%	12.5%	9.4%

Location Breakdown
Location Type	Composition of Convention	Participants of Session 1	Participants of Session 7	French Population
Urban	62%	61.0%	62.5%	59.0%
Suburban	23%	21.4%	18.8%	24.0%
Rural	15%	13.8%	15.6%	17.0%
Other	-	3.8%	3.1%	<1%

Regional Breakdown
Region	Composition of Convention	Participants of Session 1	Participants of Session 7	French Population
Auvergne-Rhône-Alpes	11%	10.1%	12.5%	11.8%
Bourgogne-Franche-Comté	2%	1.3%	1.3%	4.4%
Bretagne	5%	5.0%	5.0%	5.0%
Centre-Val de Loire	5%	4.4%	3.8%	3.9%
Corse	1%	0.6%	0.6%	0.5%
Grand Est	7%	6.3%	7.5%	8.6%
Hauts-de-France	9%	12.0%	11.9%	9.0%
Île-de-France	20%	25.2%	23.1%	17.9%
Normandie	3%	2.5%	1.3%	5.1%
Nouvelle-Aquitaine	9%	8.2%	8.8%	9.1%
Occitanie	8%	7.6%	7.6%	8.8%
Pays de la Loire	6%	5.7%	5.7%	5.5%
Provence-Alpes-Côte d'Azur	9%	7.6%	7.6%	7.7%
Guadeloupe	1%	1.3%	1.3%	0.6%
Martinique	1%	0.6%	0.6%	0.6%
Guyane	1%	0.6%	0.6%	0.3%
La Réunion	1%	1.3%	1.3%	1.2%

=== Thematic groups ===
On Sunday, October 6, 2019, the members of the Convention were divided into five thematic groups reflecting each of the policy areas they hoped the convention would address. These five groups were entitled, with their original French names in parentheses: Food and Agriculture (Se Nourrir), Housing (Se Loger), Employment and Industry (Travailler et Produire), Transportation (Se Déplacer), and Lifestyle and Consumption (Consommer).

=== Governance committee ===
A Governance Committee, tasked with ensuring the efficiency and functionality of the convention, was established prior to selecting the members of the convention. It was organized by the Economic Social and Environmental Council (CESE). The committee was entirely independent from the government, and was tasked with advocating for the protection of the will of the convention and its independence from outside threats. It was composed of:

Two Co-Presidents:

- Thierry Pech, Director General of Terra Nova
- Laurence Tubiana, President of the European Climate Foundation and negotiator of the Paris Climate Accords

Rapporteur General:

- Julien Blanchet, Vice-President of the CESE

Climate Experts:

- Jean Jouzel, climatologist, member of the French Academy of Sciences and advisor of the CESE
- Anne–Marie Ducroux, President of the CESE Environmental Department
- Michel Colombier, Co-Founder and Scientific Director of the Institute for Sustainable Development and International Relations

Participative Democracy Experts:

- Mathilde Imer, Co-President of the Open Democracy (Démocratie Ouverte) Organization and Yellow Vest activist
- Loïc Blondiaux, Professor of Political Science at Panthéon Sorbonne
- Jean-Michel Fourniau, Professor at Université Gustave Eiffel, Research Director at the French Institute of Science and Technology for Transport, Development and Networks and President of "Democracy and Participation" a research interest group

Social and Economic Experts:

- Jean Grosset, Financial Administrator of the CESE and Director of the Observatory of Social Dialogue at the Jean Jaurès Foundation
- Dominique Gillier, Vice-President of the CESE
- Marie-Claire Martel, President of the Coordination of Federations and Associations of Culture (COFAC) and advisor of the CESE
- Catherine Tissot-Colle, Communication and Sustainable Development Director of Eramet and advisor of the CESE

Two members of the Ministry of the Ecological and Inclusive Transition:

- Léo Cohen, Former Advisor to the Ministry of Ecological and Inclusive Transition
- Ophélie Risler, Chief of the "Fight against the Greenhouse Effect" Department, Director of Energy and Climate in the Ministry of Ecological and Inclusive Transition.

=== Guarantor college ===
The guarantor college ensured the convention's independence. It was composed of three individuals named by the CESE's president, the president of the Senate, and the president of the National Assembly.

- Cyril Dion, co-founder of the Colibris movement and co-director of the documentary "Tomorrow (Demain)"
- Anne Frago, director of the Culture and social Questions service of the National Assembly
- Michèle Khadi, honorary director-general of the services of Senate

== Activity ==
The convention was planned to consist of six two and a half day sessions, spanning October 2019 to February 2020 taking place every third week. Ultimately, the convention consisted of seven sessions, beginning on-schedule in October 2019, but ending in June 2020. The fourth session was initially delayed by the 2019-2020 Pension Reform Strike, which closed public transportation. Because of this delay, a seventh session was added at the request of the committee. It was then delayed again due to lockdowns for COVID-19 which began following the sixth session. The committee held two virtual sessions during lockdowns, before completing the seventh session in June 2020.

The official dates are as follows:

- First session: October 4–6, 2019
- Second session: October 25–27, 2019
- Third session: November 15–17, 2019
- Fourth session: January 10–12, 2020
- Fifth session: February 7–9, 2020
- Sixth session: March 6–8, 2020
- Seventh session: June 19–21, 2020

There was an unofficial eighth session held from February 26 to February 28, 2021.

=== First session ===
The first meeting of the convention took place from Saturday October 5 to Sunday October 7, 2019. The session was primarily focused on defining and clarifying the mission of the assembly. First, the assembly spoke with paleoclimatologist Valérie Masson-Delmonte and Director General of the Institute for Climate Economics Benoit Leguet, then the governance committee presented and took questions. At the end of the session, the convention defined five thematic areas for individual groups to focus on: housing, labor and production, transportation, food, and consumption.

The group also held meetings with important government officials, such as Prime Minister Édouard Philippe, Minister of the Ecological and Inclusive Transition Élisabeth Borne, and Member of the State Council Delphine Hédary. It featured speeches from Vice President of the Economic, Social, and Environmental Council Michel Badré, research director emeritus of the National Center for Scientific Research Patrick Criqui, Energy Transition Manager for the Augustin de Romanet Climate Action Network Anne Bringault, legal lecturer Marine Fleury, and Secretary General of the French Democratic Confederation of Labor Laurent Berger, who spoke primarily on issues relating to political difficulties of climate action.

=== Second session ===
The second session of the convention, held from Friday October 25 to Sunday October 27, 2019, was characterized by a number of hearings focusing on the biggest questions that the convention hoped to answer. After summarizing their progress from the first session, the members debated greenhouse gas emissions reductions targets and how to achieve them. Much of the work during this session was held in the 5 working groups established in the first session. These groups debated individually, but convened at the end of each session to synthesize. On Saturday, the groups discussed potential political barriers to their proposals individually, before discussing each individual group's findings as an assembly. On Sunday, they followed a similar process to discuss the work of social justice organizations.

At the end of the session, convention members had the opportunity to convey key messages to the public about their work as a convention. Many called for increased visibility and awareness, along with greater citizens' participation. Others commented on the unique nature of the convention, with most expressing support for its deliberative nature. Some at this point did worry that given the scale of the problems they would not have time to finish a proposal that they would be satisfied with. Several members also made statements in favor of social justice.

=== Third session ===
The third session met from November 15 to November 17, 2019, and was primarily spent either interviewing experts or meeting with the working groups. In total, over 60 experts spoke with the convention over the course of the weekend. Many of these meetings were contained in one working group, with each working group meeting a collection of experts simultaneously, but journalist and environmental activist Nicolas Hulot, at the request of the members, spoke individually to the whole group to describe his vision of the convention. The entire convention also heard from the team of impact assessors. Additionally, they did a "speed dating" event, where members of the convention spoke to a number of experts on the best ways to achieve the emissions target and debriefed with their working groups.

=== Fourth session ===
The fourth session was delayed from its initially scheduled time of December 6 through December 8, 2019, to January 10 through January 12, 2020, by a pension strike, which closed mass transportation. After the third session focused on formulating initial assessments of their work, the fourth session focused on identifying disagreements, sorting proposals, and beginning to write reports. Each day of the convention opened with over three hours of work within each of the thematic groups, accompanied with parallel meetings of "the squad", which was supposed to resolve differences between proposals of different committees but was disbanded after this session. At the end of the session, the committee members began writing the final proposal based on the recommendations of the working groups.

President Macron, upon invitation, gave a short speech and met each member of the convention, telling them "You took a risk in being here, but we must have this debate at the heart of society." When asked by a sixteen year old member of the convention whether he thought the future of democracy was more deliberative like the convention, he responded "At the same time that we invent deliberative democracy, we need to restore representative democracy."

=== Fifth session ===
Convention members focused on finalizing their proposals during the fifth session which ran from Friday, February 7 to Saturday, February 9, 2020. As was the case with the fourth session, much of the time in the convention centered around working in thematic groups. The first day of the session was nearly entirely group work, only punctuated with a presentation and discussion about the objectives of the fifth session and an overview of the proposals that each working group was finalizing. At the end of the day on Friday and the beginning of the day on Saturday, the working groups finalized their proposals and created a presentation that they would give to the entire convention.

After finalizing the proposals and creating the presentations, the committee questioned experts on the specific proposals of each working group. The convention then split into groups which they called "îlots" (small islands), composed of members of each working group. In the îlots, members debated and improved upon the proposals of each working group. The committee also debated whether they wanted to consider amending the constitution prior to working in îlots and volunteering members made a final judgement at the end of the Saturday session, which they presented to the group on Sunday.

On Sunday, the members finalized their work in the session by deciding what their messages to the French government and French public should be. They also discussed financing their proposals, using advice provided in a video by economists Agnès Benassy-Queré and Christian Chavagneux.

=== Sixth session ===
The sixth session was held from March 6 to March 8, 2020. The members began in their working groups before reconvening the îlots to help the members understand the proposals of each working group. They then discussed a number of issues including legislative, regulatory, and referendum-based implementation methods, constitutional amendments, and financing. They also read an official statement to be delivered to the French public.

Each working group also gave a presentation about their proposals then took questions and discussed the work of the group as a whole. Then they presented and discussed each individual "family of objectives" within each working group's domain. This process began Friday night with the consumption group, continued throughout the day with the transportation, food, and housing group on Saturday, and finished with the employment and industry group on Sunday. After completing the presentations, the group created the final report and selected by lot members to serve on the editorial board. They then finalized the official statement.

=== Seventh session ===
The seventh session was delayed due to lockdowns from COVID-19 and was ultimately held from June 19 to June 21, 2020, and was devoted to voting on the proposals of each working group. On Friday, the members debated and voted on the proposals of the transportation group, followed by a debate on the proposals of the consumption, production, and housing group. On Saturday morning, the convention debated and voted on the food group's proposal. After agreeing to 149 provisions, the committee voted and debated on finance.

The convention also considered whether to send their work to a referendum or submit it directly to parliament. After debating and completing a tentative vote on Saturday, the convention ultimately decided to bypass the referendum on Sunday. The convention ended with the submission of the final report, after several sessions of review, to Emmanuel Macron.

=== Eighth session ===
From February 26 to February 28, 2021, the members of the convention reconvened for a special eighth session to evaluate how well parliament had carried out their proposals. Those in attendance voted on how they viewed the government's handling of each of the provisions that they passed, giving a rating from 1 to 10 for each. They also answered whether they thought the convention as a whole would achieve its goal of a 40% reduction in greenhouse gas emissions since 1990 by 2030 in a spirit of social justice and whether they thought that they had a significant impact on the climate debate. They also evaluated their impact on the democratic process as a whole. Following the session, the facilitation team from the convention wrote a report on the day.

== Proposals ==
The Convention ultimately approved 149 proposals, many of them with near universal support. The policies that passed with the lowest level of support were a proposal to reduce the speed limit to 110 km/h, passing with 59.7% support, a constitutional amendment prioritizing environmental concerns with individual rights with 58% support, a referendum on whether to criminalize ecocide with 63.4% support, and giving more power to the CESE with 59% support. The only proposal to be rejected reduced the work week from 35 hours to 28 hours without salary loss. The criminalization of ecocide was considered especially significant as it emerged from the citizens and was not originally a part of the convention's expert-defined agenda.

The proposals of each working group passed with very strong support, typically above 90% for each bundle of proposals and almost always above 80%. The transportation working group passed proposals to promote alternatives to cars and improve public roads, increase the use of high-speed rail, reduce the carbon footprint of long-distance travel and air-travel, and to create a government website with all transportation options. The consumption group passed provisions mandating that companies disclose products' carbon footprint, limiting advertising for high-carbon products, restricting single-use plastic, and creating educational programs about low-carbon consumption. The housing group passed provisions to require the renovation and retrofitting of buildings by 2040 and effective land resource management to prevent urban expansion. The employment group created programs to finance the transition to a lower carbon economy, require companies to track their carbon footprints, and monitor changes in digital technology as it relates to the environment. Finally the food sector working group passed regulations on restaurants and farmers and provisions promoting local food production, limiting food waste, fostering agro-ecology, improving consumer information, increasing agricultural education, and reforming fisheries. The food group also promoted an ambitious target in the Common Agricultural Practice (CAP) negotiations.

== Government reception ==
At the outset of the convention, Prime Minister Edouard Philippe declared that the proposals of the convention would be submitted without filter, although the exact meaning of this statement was unclear. During the convention, the members decided to submit their proposals directly to the legislature rather than putting them to a referendum with the expectation that the legislature would pass a law to codify each proposal. Of the 149 proposals, Macron committed to enacting 146, choosing to play what he termed a "trump card" or a "joker" on three provisions: a change to the preamble of the constitution, a 4% tax on corporate dividends to fund climate initiatives, and a reduction in the speed limit. He argued that the change to the preamble would place environmental interests above all other liberties, that the tax on corporate dividends would reduce French competitiveness, and that he did not want to initiate more protests with the reduction in the speed limit, which was an impetus for the Yellow Vest movement.

Over the course of the drafting of the bill, a growing rift emerged between the members and supporters of the convention and the government. Members of the convention believed that the government was failing to fully enact its proposals, while some in the government believed it was going too far. Emmanuel Macron said in response to the growing rift between the convention and the government, "They helped me at the start, now they want everything." He also said "you can't say that just because 150 citizens wrote something, it's the Bible or the Koran." In response to frustrations with the government's response to the proposals of the convention, some members founded an organization called "Les 150", an advocacy group dedicated to passing the provisions put forward by the members of the citizens' assembly. In December 2020, the members of the convention and Macron met to discuss progress on the bill and news agencies reported division between the two parties over issues such as an amendment to the constitution to include environmental protection, automobile regulations, and a proposed moratorium on 5G development. At the end of this debate, Macron committed himself to putting the constitutional amendment to a referendum.

In January 2021, parliament unveiled the law drafted in response to the Citizens Convention, and it drew immediate backlash for weakening the proposals of the convention, particularly from the members of the convention itself. It also drew criticism from climate advocacy organizations such as Friends of the Earth and Climate Action Network France. Parliament was accused of watering down several key provisions. For example, the convention proposed ending all domestic flights when a rail alternative was available for less than four hours, but parliament lowered this threshold to 2.5 hours. The tax on aviation would also only take effect if the emissions return to pre-pandemic levels and the European Union takes no action. The law was also accused of weakening the ban on new airports. Ultimately, it is estimated that the bill proposed by parliament contains 40% of the proposals by the convention. Parliament began debating the bill on March 29, 2021. It passed in the National Assembly on May 4, 2021.

== Outside analysis and criticism ==
The Citizens Convention for Climate has attracted considerable attention from democratic scholars, many of whom studied the convention by observing its deliberations, monitoring its progress, and interviewing its members. One such scholar is Hélène Landemore, a political theorist, who wrote some of her observations in her book Open Democracy: Reinventing Popular Rule for the Twenty-First Century. She observed a three-way struggle for power and legitimacy between the members of the convention, traditional formal institutions like parliament, and civic organizations and social movements like the Citizen Vests, a major proponent of the convention. She describes how the broad support for the social movements was able to pressure elected officials to give more autonomy to the Convention on Climate. While the social movements endorsed the creation of the convention, they believed that elected officials were using it to signal their support for social movements without making real changes. She also describes how the members of the convention became defensive of their proposals against attempts to influence them, whether these attempts came from formal governmental institutions or from experts. She believes that the empowerment of the citizens through the citizens' assembly also empowers them to protect their ideas and proposals. She also believes that in a large enough citizens' assembly, there will statistically be several strong personalities to defend the more timid members of the convention. Landemore notes this in the way that citizens discussed the carbon tax, as she believes the members often felt like political pawns to garner support for the carbon tax causing them to be less open with experts proposing it. She cites an anecdote when an expert was describing the benefits of a carbon tax, a member of the convention shouted "stop treating us like children" as evidence. She notes two other confrontations as illustrations of the convention's strength against attempts to influence by experts. First, when a representative from the Bouygues corporation called for a complete renovation of all French homes with cheaper labor, members accused him of a conflict of interest. Second, when an expert questioned the housing group about their proposals and how they would be financed, the members of the convention rose to each others' defense. In contrast to the occasionally adversarial tone with parliament, Landemore notices the congenial tone amongst the members, which she believes is indicative of good intragroup relationships in this type of citizens' assemblies.

A team of French observers led by Louis-Gaëtan Giraudet also wrote a report describing and analyzing the convention in which they questioned the extent of the expert involvement. They acknowledged that experts played a substantial role in designing the convention's activities, but were unsure about whether the experts hampered the participants creativity. They noted that throughout the convention, experts often attempted to sway citizens towards a particular policy that he or she may not have initially supported. This contributed to a tension they noted among several citizens who felt obligated to create measures that were both bold and practical. Further commenting on expert involvement and training, they suggest that the citizens should have been trained in deliberation. They also cast doubt on what they describe as a prevailing notion that the overwhelming consensus achieved by the convention on their proposals as evidence that the citizens were extremely well informed. They believe that because provisions were passed in blocks rather than as individual proposals, some may have been unable to express their dissent for one specific proposal within a group of proposals. They also believe that the citizens' active involvement in creating each proposal makes them predisposed to support them and that they would already be broadly popular and consensual with the convention by the time to vote on the proposals.

The convention has drawn comparisons to other deliberative mini-publics, most notably the Citizens Assembly of the United Kingdom (CAUK), which overlapped with the Citizens' Convention for Climate. Claire Miller and Rich Wilson have noted several similarities between the two citizens' assemblies. As they note, both were created in response to widespread protest. In France, this was the Yellow Vest protest movement, while in the United Kingdom, this was the protests by the Extinction Rebellion movement. They also noted that both citizens' assemblies followed the traditional format of a learning phase, followed by deliberation, followed by voting. In both groups, the members were split into several working groups, although the French Convention had five groups while the Citizens' Assembly of the United Kingdom had three. They also note that both groups created proposals that were, in their view, bolder than proposals previously made by politicians. In addition to these three similarities, they note several key differences. The French convention was given a larger budget, it was given a more formal role in comparison to the CAUK's more advisory role, citizens and interest groups were given more authority to define the role of the convention, members were encouraged to be more active in politics, and members had more agency to redefine the role and rules of the convention. Additionally, the French Citizen's Convention was created in order to design new policy while the CAUK was created to evaluate existing policy. They also observed that the French convention sparked a greater national debate than the CAUK.

The French government has been criticized for its handling of the proposals of the convention. This has led some to question whether the convention was truly a success considering parliament's proposed bill did not incorporate all of the resolutions of the convention. Over the course of the legislative process, news agencies reported the growing tensions between members of the convention and parliament. While this process was underway, Hélène Landemore expressed uncertainty in her book about whether the convention would have any real impact on the fight against climate change. When the bill in response to the convention was released in January 2021 and did not contain many proposals of the convention, one news agency questioned whether the Citizens Convention on Climate was a failed experiment, concluding that the true future and result of the convention remained to be seen and expressed a belief in the strong possibility that the deliberative model would be repeated. The citizens themselves, when polled in a special eighth session, gave the government an average rating of a 3.3/10 for its consideration of the proposals of the convention and an average rating of 2.5/10 about their confidence that France would reach its emissions reduction target of 40% reduction from 1990 by 2030 in a spirit of social justice. They did, however, give an average rating of a 6/10 for how much they influenced the French debate on climate change and a rating of a 7.7/10 for their impressions of how they improved democracy.
