= Debra Satz =

American philosopher

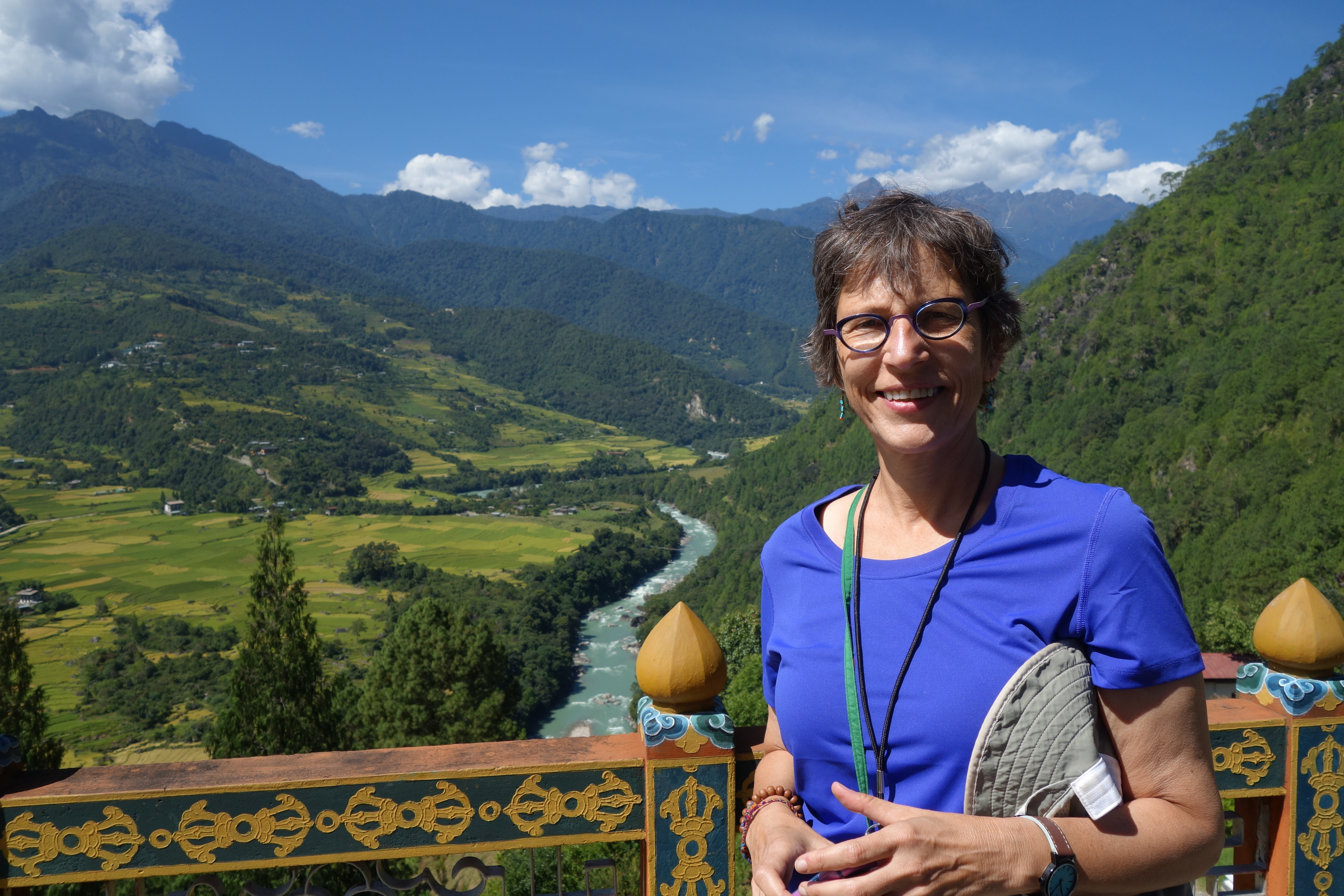

Education
- Education: City College of New York (BA); Massachusetts Institute of Technology (PhD)

Philosophical work
- Era: Contemporary philosophy
- Region: American philosophy
- Institutions: Stanford University
- Main interests: Political philosophy Philosophy of social science Philosophy of economics Philosophy of education Ethics; Feminist philosophy Freedom of speech Global justice Democracy; Justice; Ethics and international relations Ethics and markets

Debra Satz is an American philosopher and the Vernon R. & Lysbeth Warren Anderson Dean of the School of Humanities and Sciences at Stanford University. She is the Marta Sutton Weeks Professor of Ethics in Society and Director of Stanford's program in this field, Professor of Philosophy and, by courtesy, Political Science. She teaches courses in ethics, social and political philosophy, and philosophy of social science.

== Education ==
Satz earned a BA in philosophy from the City College of New York, then a PhD in philosophy from Massachusetts Institute of Technology.

== Career ==
Her research has focused on the ethical limits of markets, the place of equality in political philosophy, theories of rational choice, democratic theory, feminist philosophy, and issues of international justice. She has published in Philosophy and Public Affairs, Ethics, and The Journal of Philosophy, among other journals.

Satz was named to the 2018 Class of the American Academy of Arts and Sciences.

Satz received the Walter J. Gores Award for Excellence in Teaching, Stanford's highest teaching award, in 2004. The award cited her "extraordinary teaching that combines rigorous thought with serious engagement in the moral dilemmas facing humanity". She also co-founded and teaches in the Hope House Scholars Program, through which incarcerated women and volunteer faculty examine personal experience in the context of ethics, moral philosophy and social justice.

== Publications ==
- Ideas That Matter: Democracy, Justice, Rights. With Annabelle Lever. Oxford University Press, 2019.
- Economic Analysis, Moral Philosophy, and Public Policy. With Dan Hausman and Michael McPherson. Cambridge University Press, 2017.
- Why Some Things Should Not Be for Sale: The Moral Limits of Markets. Oxford University Press, 2010.
- Equality in Education and Weighted Student Funding, Education, Finance and Policy, 2008.
- Equality, Adequacy and Education for Citizenship, Ethics, July 2007.
- Countering the Wrongs of the Past: the Role of Compensation, ed. Jon Miller and Rahul Kumar, Reparations: Interdisciplinary Inquiries. Oxford University Press, 2007.
- Liberalism, Economic Freedom and the Limits of Markets, Social Philosophy and Policy, 2006.
- World Poverty and Human Wrongs, Ethics and International Affairs, vol. 19, no. 1, Spring 2005.
- Feminist Perspectives on Reproduction and the Family, Stanford Encyclopedia of Philosophy, 2004.
- Child Labor: A Normative Perspective, World Bank Economic Review, 17 (2), 2003.
