= International ethics =

Ethics in International Relations

International ethics is an area of international relations theory which in one way or another concerns the extent and scope of ethical obligations between states in an era of globalization. Schools of thought include cosmopolitanism and anti-cosmopolitanism. Realism, Liberalism, and Marxism are ethical traditions that conceptually address moral issues in international relations.

== Realism ==
Realism's position is that ethics are secondary, or inapplicable to the affairs of international politics and believes in the primacy of self-interest over moral principle. The pursuit of self-interest by states is viewed as a right, or duty, making it a principle for Realists to uphold. From their standpoint, the international environment is perpetually anarchic and competitive over resources. There is no overarching authority over states. Without a superior power to enforce order, ethics do not sustain in international affairs. Out of necessity, “international conditions compel states to defend their interests by frequently immoral means, and this compulsion of self-defense dissolves moral duties.” It would be considered unethical by the principle of pursuing self-interest, for a state to compromise its goal for power and security.
