= Omnilateralism =

Omnilateralism (from omnibus in Latin "for all and by all") is used as a term in international relations in order to distinguish movements towards comprehensive global governance from the current multilateral institutions that have evolved since the Congress of Vienna based on the Westphalian System with its focus on the sovereignty of nations.

== History ==
Historically, the Prussian philosopher Immanuel Kant defined omnilateral in the Science of Right, the first part of the Metaphysics of Morals (1797), as "derived from the particular wills of all the individuals".

== Omnilateralism as a political philosophy ==
While multilateralism refers only to multiple countries working in concert on a given issue, omnilateralism connotes a wider participation by all and a broader purpose for all. Hence, it includes not only nations in the United Nations, but also Non-Governmental Organisations as well as private actors and Civil society at large that can together contribute to the advancement of the common global good.

The term omnilateralism is in particular used in the context of issues that can be solved neither unilaterally by one country, nor bilaterally between two countries, or plurilaterally at a regional level, like the European Union, or multilaterally by institutions such as the G20 or the United Nations, since they do not encompass all actors concerned.

== Omnilateral issues ==
Typical issues of omnilateralism relate to the global environment, avoidance of conflicts of civilisations, multiculturalism and minorities.

== See also ==
- Polarity in international relations
- Plurilateral agreement
- Bilateralism
- Unilateralism
- New world order (politics)
- United Nations
- European Union

== Sources ==
- The European Union and the United States in East Asia: The Need for Omnilateralism, A Personal View by a European, in: World Affairs, New Delhi, July–September 1997, p. 94-109, by Wolfgang Pape

Opening to Omnilateralism: Democratic governance for all, from local to global with stakeholders, 汎地球主義　全边主義”, AuthorHouse UK, Bloomington 2021, 590 p., ISBN 978-1-6655-8213-1,
by Wolfgang Pape

Opening Towards Omnilateralism, in: Baikady, R., Sajid, S., Nadesan, V., Przeperski, J., Islam, M.R., Gao, J. (eds) The Palgrave Handbook of Global Social Change. Palgrave Macmillan, Cham., 6.8.2022, https://doi.org/10.1007/978-3-030-87624-1_218-1, by Wolfgang Pape
