= David Estlund =

American philosopher

- Family: Ann Estlund (mother), Bruce Estlund (father), (Note: Estlund mentioned his parents names in his book dedication for Democratic Theory: A Philosophical Framework (2008)) Cynthia Estlund (sister)

Education
- Education: University of Wisconsin, Madison (PhD)

Philosophical work
- Era: 21st-century philosophy
- Region: Western Philosophy
- School: Analytic
- Institutions: Brown University
- Main interests: Political philosophy · Democratic theory
- Notable ideas: Epistemic proceduralism

David Estlund is the Lombardo Family Professor of Philosophy at Brown University, where he has taught since 1991. He works primarily in political philosophy.

== Education and career ==
Estlund earned his Ph.D. in philosophy from the University of Wisconsin, Madison, and taught briefly at the University of California, Irvine, before moving to Brown. He has spent fellowship years at the Program in Ethics at Harvard University and at Australian National University. His research interests center on liberalism, justice, and especially democracy. He sits on the editorial board of the academic journal Representation. He is editor of the collections Democracy (Blackwell, 2002) and The Oxford Handbook of Political Philosophy (Oxford University Press, 2012), and the author of Democratic Authority: A Philosophical Framework (Princeton University Press, 2008) and Utopophobia. On The Limits (If Any) Of Political Philosophy, (Princeton University Press, 2019).
