= Hélène Landemore =

French political scientist

- Born: 1976 (age 49–50)
- Education: Harvard University, PhD
- Occupations: Researcher; political scientist
- Employer: Yale University (since 2009)
- Known for: Open democracy; cognitive diversity

Hélène Landemore is a French professor of political science at Yale University. She has a PhD from Harvard.

In her subfield, political theory, she is known for her work on democratic theory. She is the author of Politics Without Politicians: The Case for Citizen Rule (2026).

== Biography ==
After a childhood spent in Normandy, Landemore began higher studies in Paris at the age of 18. In 2008, she received a Ph.D. from Harvard University with a thesis on the idea of collective intelligence applied to the justification of democracy.

She researched the 2010–13 Icelandic constitutional reform and directly observed the 2019–20 French Citizens Convention for Climate. She was a member of the Global Governance and Participation Committee of the 2021 Global Assembly on the Climate and Ecological Crisis. In September 2022, she was appointed to the governance committee of the French citizens' convention on end of life. She regularly presents her ideas and proposals in French and American newspapers.

== Theories ==
Landemore's research focuses on deliberative democracy and collective intelligence.

=== Criticism of electoral democracy ===
Like David Van Reybrouck, she observes that elections are more aristocratic than democratic, as they empower a tiny social elite. Elected parliaments are never representative of the entire population. In particular, women, working-class people, and social minorities are systematically underrepresented.

Money provided by rich donors to political campaigns have an important impact on electoral politics, particularly in the United States. As a result, the US more closely resembles a plutocracy, in which the economic elite has more influence on politics than the vast majority of the population.

=== Sortition and citizens' assembly ===
Landemore sees a new institution as the "key" to a new form of democracy. She calls it the "open mini-public". It is a citizens' assembly of a few hundred people chosen by lot.

=== Cognitive diversity ===
The diversity of the members of an assembly is a strength for deliberation. Landemore holds that reflection will be richer and more nuanced if it involves different perspectives, life experiences, and knowledge, and thus, an assembly chosen by lot is generally preferable to an assembly of experts.

=== Open democracy ===
Landemore proposes a paradigm of "open democracy", which rests on five principles:

- Participation rights: the rights of expression and association, to which are added the rights of petition and citizen initiatives. These rights would enable the convocation of a referendum on a law voted by the parliament.
- Deliberation: decisions must come from discussion between equal citizens. The floor must not be monopolized by a few gifted orators.
- Majoritarian principle: instead of supermajority rules, which produce blocking minorities, votes must integrate new and fairer methods, such as majority judgment.
- Democratic representation: this can better be achieved through sortition, and, to a lesser extent, voluntary participation.
- Transparency: of the process and of the results of deliberations, in real-time or afterwards. Transparency requires that information be made public and legible to citizens.

== Works ==
=== Books in English ===
- Hélène Landemore, Jon Elster, et al., eds., Collective Wisdom: Principles and Mechanisms, Cambridge, Cambridge University Press, 2012.
- Hélène Landemore, Democratic Reason: Politics, Collective Intelligence, and the Rule of the Many, Princeton, Princeton University Press, 2017.
- Hélène Landemore, Open Democracy: Reinventing Popular Rule for the Twenty-First Century, Princeton, Princeton University Press, 2020.
- Hélène Landemore and Jason Brennan, Debating Democracy: Do We Need More or Less?, Oxford University Press, 2021.
- Lucy Bernholz, Hélène Landemore, and Rob Reich, eds., Digital Technology and Democratic Theory, Chicago, Chicago University Press, 2021.
- Hélène Landemore, Politics without Politicians: The Case for Citizen Rule, London, Allen Lane, 2026.

=== Books in French ===
- Hélène Landemore, Hume. Probabilité et choix raisonnable, Paris, PUF, 2004.

== See also ==
- Athenian democracy
