= Edmond & Lily Safra Center for Ethics =

Research center at Harvard University

- Established: 1986; 40 years ago
- Director: Eric Beerbohm
- Location: Cambridge, Massachusetts, United States
- Operating agency: Harvard University
- Website: ethics.harvard.edu

The Edmond & Lily Safra Center for Ethics is a research center at Harvard University in Cambridge, Massachusetts. The center's mission is to "advance teaching and research on ethical issues in public life." It is named for Edmond J. Safra and Lily Safra and is supported by the Edmond J. Safra Foundation. The Center for Ethics was the first interfaculty initiative at Harvard University.

Founded as the Program in Ethics and the Professions in 1986, the center has supported the work of more than 800 fellows and visiting scholars. Many have spent a year or more at the center. They include professors, graduate students, and undergraduates, journalists, physicians, lawyers, psychologists from many educational institutions and governments throughout the world.

The center does not promote a particular theory or conception of ethics or morality but rather encourages rigorous study of difficult ethical issues, informed by empirical research and philosophical analysis. Although the range of topics range widely, major themes have included professional ethics, institutional corruption, “Diversity, Justice and Democracy,” and "Political Economy and Justice."

== History ==
=== 20th century ===
Harvard president Derek Bok argued that there was a pressing need for "problem-oriented courses in ethics" that would prepare students for the moral dilemmas and ethical decisions they would face throughout their careers. He recruited Dennis Thompson, then a professor at Princeton, to come to Harvard to start a new program. It was Harvard's first major inter-faculty initiative.

In 1990, a graduate fellows program was established by Arthur Applbaum, a fellow in the first class and now a professor of ethics at the Harvard Kennedy School.

Thompson worked with Bok, and subsequent Harvard Presidents Neil Rudenstine and Lawrence Summers to raise funds to support the program which now has an endowment of more than $55 million. major benefactors are the Edmond J. Safra Foundation, the estate of Lester Kissel, Eugene P. Beard and the American Express Foundation.

Twenty years later, Bok observed that "one of the best new developments in professional education is the wide and growing interest in resolving problems of ethics. Harvard’s Center was instrumental in this effort, and it has exceeded even my own optimistic expectations."

=== 21st century ===
In 2008, Thompson stepped down, and Lawrence Lessig, a scholar of Internet law at Stanford University, was appointed to lead the center. He had been a fellow at the center in 1996-1997 and developed his ideas on Internet law there. As director, Lessig led a campaign against institutional corruption. He took the campaign to the public, and ran for President of the U.S. in 2015.

In 2011, the center announced a partnership with InnoCentive "seeking innovative systems to monitor institutions for potential signs of corrupting forces."

After Lessig resigned in 2015, he was replaced by Danielle Allen, a political theorist at the Institute for Advanced Study at Princeton. Her vision took the program from the Thompson and Lessig eras into a larger endeavor to target world problems.

Eric Beerbohm became the center's fourth director. Harvard University provost and chief academic officer Alan Garber stated that Beerbohm's intellectual achievements in ethics and political thought and his cross-disciplinary engagement both inside and outside the University made him an ideal candidate. Beerbohm has a long history of engagement with the center, having served as a faculty fellow from 2009 to 2010, and then as Director of Graduate Fellowships from 2010 to 2017 and Founding Director of its Undergraduate Fellowship Program.

== Faculty ==
In July 2023, Beerbohm was appointed director of the Edmond & Lily Safra Center for Ethics, replacing Danielle Allen, who served in this position from 2015. She succeeded Lawrence Lessig, who served from 2009 to 2015. Dennis Thompson, appointed by President Derek Bok in 1986, is the founding director.

== Fellowships ==
The center offers four categories of fellowships: undergraduate fellows, graduate fellows, fellows-in-residence; and ethics pedagogy fellows. In 2016, the center entered into a partnership with the Berggruen Institute's Philosophy and Culture Center, as a partner institution for the Berggruen Fellowship Program. The Philosophy and Culture Center supports three Berggruen fellows each year. Berggruen fellows engage in scholarship of broad social and political importance from cross-cultural perspectives, and demonstrate a commitment to the public dissemination of their ideas.

== Notable fellows and alumni ==
- Rajeev Bhargava, former director of the Centre for the Study of Developing Societies, New Delhi
- Ezekiel Emanuel, founding chair of Department of Bioethics, National Institutes of Health, Chair of Department of Medical Ethics and Health Policy at the University of Pennsylvania
- Heather Gerken, legal adviser to Obama campaign in 2008 and 2012 and Professor of Law, Yale University
- Amy Gutmann, founder of Princeton University's Center for Human Values, former president of University of Pennsylvania, United States ambassador to Germany
- Chris Hayes, political commentator and TV show host, MSNBC
- Elizabeth Kiss, founder, Kenan Institute for Ethics, Duke University, eighth president of Agnes Scott College and now Warden of Rhodes House, Oxford
- Sanford Levinson, constitutional commentator and Professor of Law, University of Texas
- Robert Massie, Episcopal priest, politician, author, and environmental activist, and former candidate for Lieutenant Governor in Massachusetts
- Samuel Moyn, Berggruen Institute fellow, Jeremiah Smith, Jr. Professor of Law, Harvard Law School
- Richard Pildes, NBC and ABC commentator on elections and law professor, New York University
- Samantha Power, former U.S. ambassador to the United Nations
- Jedediah Purdy, author and law professor, Duke University
- Lily Safra, philanthropist
- Aaron Swartz, internet activist who committed suicide in 2013 while under federal indictment for alleged computer crimes connected to downloading a large academic journal archive
- Yael Tamir, former minister of education, Government of Israel
- Melissa Williams, founder of the Centre for Ethics, University of Toronto
