= David E. Campbell (political scientist) =

Canadian political scientist

- Born: David Edward Campbell; November 29, 1971 (age 54); Medicine Hat, Alberta, Canada
- Spouse: Kirsten Campbell

Academic background
- Education: Brigham Young University (BA); Harvard University (MA, PhD)
- Thesis: Participation in Context: How Communities and Schools Shape Civic Engagement (2002)
- Doctoral advisor: Robert D. Putnam; Paul E. Peterson

Academic work
- Discipline: Political science
- Institutions: University of Notre Dame
- Main interests: American politics; civic engagement; Mormonism and politics; political behavior; political science of religion
- Notable works: American Grace (2010), Secular Surge (2020)
- Website: davidecampbell.wordpress.com

David Edward Campbell (born November 29, 1971) is a Canadian political scientist and is the Packey J. Dee Professor of American Democracy at the University of Notre Dame and the founding director of the Rooney Center for the Study of American Democracy. He is currently the Director of the Notre Dame Democracy Initiative.

== Early life and education ==
Campbell was born on November 29, 1971, in Medicine Hat, Alberta. He received a Bachelor of Arts degree in political science from Brigham Young University and Master of Arts and Doctor of Philosophy degrees in political science from Harvard University. His doctoral advisors were Robert D. Putnam and Paul E. Peterson. Campbell is married with two children.

== Politics and religion ==
Campbell has co-authored the books See Jane Run: How Women Politicians Matter for Young People with Christina Wolbrecht;Secular Surge: A New Fault Line in American Politics with Geoffrey C. Layman and John C. Green; American Grace: How Religion Divides and Unites Us with Robert D. Putnam; and Seeking the Promised Land Mormons and American Politics with Quin Monson and John C. Green. He is also the author of Why We Vote: How Communities Shape our Civic Lives.

Campbell has written about how the rise of secularism in the United States is a direct consequence of a backlash against the close ties between the religious right and the Republican Party. As he summarized his research in an interview, "I would say to churches, on both the left and the right, that if you want to bring people back to the pews, you want to stay out of politics."

== Books ==
- See Jane Run: How Women Politicians Matter for Young People (with Christina Wolbrecht) University of Chicago Press, 2025. ISBN 978-0226839516
- Secular Surge: A New Fault Line in American Politics (with John C. Green and Geoffrey C. Layman) Cambridge University Press, December 2020. ISBN 978-1108831130

2022 Distinguished Book Award, Society for the Scientific Study of Religion
2022 Honorable Mention, Hubert Morken Award for Best Book in Religion and Politics, Religion and Politics Section of the American Political Science Association

- Seeking the Promised Land: Mormons and American Politics (with John C. Green and J. Quin Monson) Cambridge University Press, 2014. ISBN 978-1107662674
- American Grace: How Religion Divides and Unites Us (with Robert D. Putnam) Simon & Schuster, 2010. ISBN 978-1416566717

2011 Woodrow Wilson Foundation Book Award
2011 Wilbur Award, Religion Communicators Council

- Why We Vote: How Schools and Communities Shape Our Civic Life Princeton University Press, 2008. ISBN 978-0691138299

Edited volumes:

- Making Civics Count: Citizenship Education for a New Generation (with Meira Levinson, and Frederick M. Hess) Harvard Education Press, 2012. ISBN 9781612504766
- A Matter of Faith: Religion in the 2004 Presidential Election Brookings Institution Press, 2007. ISBN 9780815713296
- Charters, Vouchers, and Public Education (with Paul E. Peterson) Brookings Institution Press, 2001. ISBN 9780815798248
