= Charney =

Charney is a surname. Notable people with the surname include:

- Ann Charney (born 1940) Polish-Canadian novelist
- April Charney (born 1957) American consumer advocate
- Baruch Charney Vladeck (1886–1938), Belarusian-American socialist politician
- Charles de Lauzon de Charney, Governor of New France (1656–1657)
- Dennis Charney American biological psychiatrist
- Dov Charney (born 1969), founder and CEO of American Apparel
- Evan Charney, American political scientist
- Geoffrey de Charney, Preceptor of Normandy for the Knights Templar
- George Blake Charney (1905–1975), Ukrainian-American communist politician
- Jordan Charney (born 1937), American actor
- Jule Gregory Charney (1917–1981), American meteorologist
- Leon Charney, American real estate tycoon
- Melvin Charney (born 1935), Canadian architect
- Noah Charney (born 1979), American art historian and novelist
- Peter Charney (born 1989), Guinness World Record holder for Most Indoor Bungee Jumps in 24 Hours
- Suzanne Charney (born 1944) American actress and dancer

== See also ==
- Charney Bassett
- Charney Road railway station in Mumbai
- Charnay (disambiguation)
- Charny (disambiguation)
- Czarny
- Czerny
