= Meira Levinson =

American political philosopher

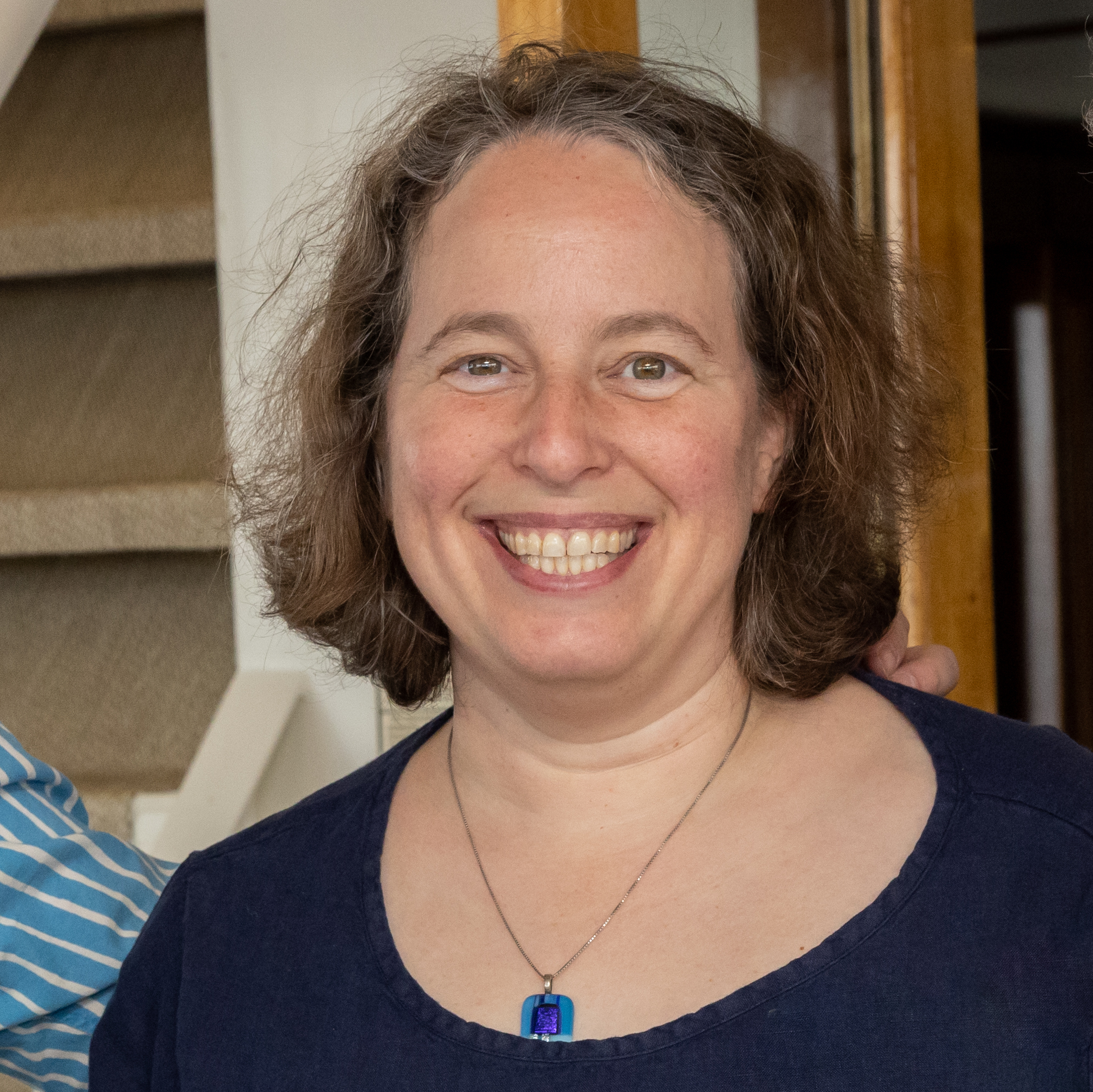
- Levinson in 2023
- Occupation: Philosopher
- Employer: Harvard Graduate School of Education
- Father: Sanford Levinson
- Awards: Guggenheim Fellow (2014)

Academic background
- Education: Yale University; Nuffield College, Oxford
- Thesis: Autonomy, Schooling, and the Reconstruction of the Liberal Educational Ideal (1996)

Academic work
- Discipline: Political philosophy; Philosophy of education

Meira Levinson is an American political philosopher who is Juliana W. and William Foss Thompson Professor of Education and Society at the Harvard Graduate School of Education. A 2014 Guggenheim Fellow, she is author of The Demands of Liberal Education (1999) and No Citizen Left Behind (2012), as well as co-editor of Making Civics Count (2012) and Dilemmas of Educational Ethics (2016).

== Biography ==
Meira Levinson was born to legal scholar Sanford Levinson and children's writer Cynthia Levinson. She obtained her BA in Philosophy from Yale University in 1992 and PhD at Nuffield College, Oxford in 1997; her doctoral dissertation was titled Autonomy, Schooling, and the Reconstruction of the Liberal Educational Ideal.

Levinson originally worked as a middle school teacher at T. Walden Middle School in Atlanta and John W. McCormack Middle School in Boston. In 2007, she became an assistant professor of education at the Harvard Graduate School of Education (HGSE), before being promoted to associate professor in 2011 and to full professor in 2015. In 2021, she became the Juliana W. and William Foss Thompson Professor of Education and Society at HGSE.

Levinson works in political philosophy, particularly "the intersection of educational ethics, civic education, youth empowerment, and racial justice". She won a 2013 American Educational Studies Association Critics' Choice Award, the 2013 North American Society for Social Philosophy Book Award and 2013 Michael Harrington Book Award for No Citizen Left Behind. In 2014, she was awarded a Guggenheim Fellowship in Education. She and Jacob Fay won the 2020 American Educational Research Association SIG Outstanding Book Award in Moral Development and Education for their book Democratic Discord in Schools. Other books she has co-editor or authored include The Demands of Liberal Education (1999), Making Civics Count (2012), and Dilemmas of Educational Ethics (2016). She became part of the editorial board for Theory and Research in Education in 2006.

== Bibliography ==
- The Demands of Liberal Education (1999)
- (ed. with David E. Campbell and Frederick M. Hess) Making Civics Count (2012)
- No Citizen Left Behind (2012)
- (ed. with Jacob Fay) Dilemmas of Educational Ethics (2016)
- (with Jacob Fay) Democratic Discord in Schools (2019)
- (with Jeremy T. Murphy) Instructional Moves for Powerful Teaching in Higher Education (2023)
- (ed. with Tatiana Geron, Sara O'Brien, and Ellis Reid) Civic Contestation in Global Education (2024)
- (ed. with Tatiana Geron, Sara O'Brien, and Ellis Reid) Educational Equity in a Global Context (2024)
