= American Society for Political and Legal Philosophy =

Learned society

The American Society for Political and Legal Philosophy (ASPLP) is a learned society founded in 1955 by political theorist Carl Friedrich. Its aim is to bring together scholars in political science, law, and philosophy who are interested in interdisciplinary exploration of a range of problems in political and legal philosophy. The ASPLP's main activities are to hold an annual conference, on a topic chosen in advance by the membership, and to publish the papers, along with formal commentary and invited additional essays, in Nomos, its yearbook. As Friedrich explained in the Preface to Authority, the first yearbook: "We are calling the series NOMOS, which is the broadest Greek term for law, because in this term there are also traditionally comprised the notions of a basic political order and of customs and a way of life." He continued: "It describes reasonably well, and perhaps better than any term of modern English, what must be the focus of a society such as ours, uniting the several social sciences, law, and philosophy." That commitment to interdisciplinary normative inquiry has characterized the ASPLP and the Nomos series ever since.

Nomos, published by New York University Press from 1977 through the present, has included work by some of the leading political and legal theorists of the twentieth and twenty-first centuries, from a wide range of ideological and methodological perspectives, including Danielle Allen, Hannah Arendt, Isaiah Berlin, Jon Elster, Richard Epstein, Lon Fuller, Jean Hampton, Catharine MacKinnon, Frank I. Michelman, Robert Nozick, Martha Nussbaum, Richard Posner, John Rawls, Nancy L. Rosenblum, Judith Shklar, Cass Sunstein, Jeremy Waldron, Michael Walzer, Sheldon Wolin, and Iris Marion Young. The series was edited by Friedrich for volumes I-VIII, coedited by J. Roland Pennock and John Chapman for volumes IX-XXXI, and edited by Chapman alone for XXXI-XXXV. Since then, series editors have included Ian Shapiro, Stephen Macedo, Melissa Williams, Sanford Levinson, James E. Fleming, and Jack Knight. In recent years, the series has been edited by Melissa Schwartzberg, Eric Beerbohm, and, beginning in 2023, Chiara Cordelli.

== Presidents ==
The presidency of the ASPLP rotates among the three disciplines of political science, law, and philosophy, with vice-presidents always representing the other two. The Presidents have been:

- Carl J. Friedrich
- Charles M. Hendel
- Lon L. Fuller
- Frederick Watkins
- Richard B. Brandt
- Jerome Hall
- J. Roland Pennock
- John Rawls
- Graham Hughes
- Sheldon Wolin
- John Ladd
- Paul A. Freund
- Judith N. Shklar
- Alan Gewirth
- Louis Henkin
- Dennis Frank Thompson
- Joel Feinberg
- Kent Greenawalt
- Michael Walzer
- Martha Nussbaum
- Frank Michelman
- Amy Gutmann
- Will Kymlicka
- Donald L. Horowitz
- Nancy L. Rosenblum
- Debra Satz
- James E. Fleming
- Stephen Macedo
- David Estlund

== Publications ==
The ASPLP holds an interdisciplinary conference every year, including papers by scholars from political science, philosophy, and law, on a topic chosen by the membership. It publishes those papers, along with formal commentary and invited additional essays, in NOMOS, its yearbook. The volumes in the NOMOS series, and their publishers, have been:

- I. Authority, Harvard University Press, 1958
- II. Community The Liberal Arts Press, 1959
- III. Responsibility, The Liberal Arts Press, 1960
- IV. Liberty, Atherton Press, 1962
- V. The Public Interest, Atherton Press, 1962
- VI. Justice, Atherton Press, 1963
- VII. Rational Decision, Atherton Press, 1964
- VIII. Revolution, Atherton Press, 1966
- IX. Equality, Atherton Press, 1967
- X. Representation, Atherton Press, 1968
- XI. Voluntary Associations, Atherton Press, 1969
- XII. Political and Legal Obligation, Atherton Press, 1970
- XIII. Privacy, Atherton Press, 1971
- XIV. Coercion, Aldine-Atherton Press, 1972
- XV. The Limits of Law, Lieber-Atherton Press, 1974
- XVI. Participation in Politics, Lieber-Atherton Press, 1975
- XVII. Human Nature in Politics, New York University Press, 1977
- XVIII. Due Process, New York University Press, 1977
- XIX. Anarchism, New York University Press, 1978
- XX. Constitutionalism, New York University Press, 1979
- XXI. Compromise in Ethics, Law, and Politics, New York University Press, 1979
- XXII. Property, New York University Press, 1980
- XXIII. Human Rights, New York University Press, 1981
- XXIV. Ethics, Economics, and the Law, New York University Press, 1982
- XXV. Liberal Democracy, New York University Press, 1983
- XXVI. Marxism, New York University Press, 1983
- XXVII. Criminal Justice, New York University Press, 1985
- XXVIII. Justification, New York University Press, 1985
- XXIX. Authority Revisited, New York University Press, 1987
- XXX. Religion, Morality, and the Law, New York University Press, 1988
- XXXI. Markets and Justice, New York University Press, 1989
- XXXII. Majorities and Minorities, New York University Press, 1990
- XXXIII. Compensatory Justice, New York University Press, 1991
- XXXIV. Virtue, New York University Press, 1992
- XXXV. Democratic Community. New York University Press, 1993
- XXXVI. The Rule of Law, New York University Press, 1994
- XXXVII. Theory and Practice, New York University Press, 1995
- XXXVIII. Political Order, New York University Press, 1996
- XXXIX. Ethnicity and Group Rights, New York University Press, 1997
- XL. Integrity and Conscience, New York University Press, 1998
- XLI. Global Justice, New York University Press, 1999
- XLII. Designing Democratic Institutions, New York University Press, 2000
- XLIII. Moral and Political Education, New York University Press, 2001
- XLIV. Child, Family, and State, New York University Press, 2002
- XLV. Secession and Self-Determination, New York University Press, 2003
- XLVI. Political Exclusion and Domination, New York University Press, 2004
- XLVII. Humanitarian Intervention, New York University Press, 2005
- XLVIII. Toleration and Its Limits, New York University Press, 2008
- XLIX. Moral Universalism and Pluralism, New York University Press, 2008
- L. Getting to the Rule of Law, New York University Press, 2011
- LI. Transitional Justice, New York University Press, 2012
- LII. Evolution and Morality, New York University Press, 2012
- LIII. Passions and Emotions, New York University Press, 2012
- LIV. Loyalty, New York University Press, 2013
- LV. Federalism and Subsidiarity, New York University Press, 2014
- LVI. American Conservatism, New York University Press, 2016
- LVII. Immigration, Emigration, and Migration, New York University Press, 2017
- LVIII. Wealth, New York University Press, 2017
- LVIX. Compromise, New York University Press, 2018
- LX. Privatization, New York University Press, 2019
- LXI. Political Legitimacy, New York University Press, 2019
- LXII. Protest and Dissent, New York University Press, 2020
- LXIII. Democratic Failure, New York University Press, 2020
- LXIV. Truth and Evidence, New York University Press, 2021
- LXV. Reconciliation and Repair, New York University Press, 2023

forthcoming from New York University Press:

- LXVI. Civic Education in Polarized Times, forthcoming 2024
- LXVII. Policing
- LXVIII. Climate Change

The volumes from 1977 (NOMOS XVII) to 2017 (NOMOS LVIII) are available on JSTOR.
