= Evan Charney =

American political scientist

- Education: CUNY Hunter College; Harvard University
- Known for: Criticism of genopolitics
- Scientific career
- Fields: Political science
- Institutions: Duke University
- Thesis: Taking pluralism seriously (2000)
- Doctoral advisors: Dennis F. Thompson; Arthur Applbaum; Russell Muirhead
- Website: sites.duke.edu/evancharney/

Evan Charney is an American political scientist and associate professor of the practice in the Sanford School of Public Policy at Duke University. He is also an affiliate of the Duke Initiative for Science & Society and a faculty network member of the Duke Institute for Brain Sciences. He originally joined the Sanford School faculty in 1999, while he was still a Ph.D. student. His research focuses on the intersection between public policy and neuroscience. He is known for his criticism of genopolitics and the assumptions on which such research is based. He has compared studies linking human genetic variants to political beliefs to phrenology, arguing, "The truth of the matter is so much more complicated. The problem is that people don’t like complicated stories."

In 2018, the Sanford School announced it would not renew Charney's contract after some of his students alleged that his classes reproduce and reinforce racial, gender, and class inequality. In response to this decision, a group of 101 current and former Duke students signed on to a letter to Sally Kornbluth, the provost of Duke University, urging her to reconsider her decision. The letter was published in the Duke Chronicle on May 8, 2018. Despite this letter, Kornbluth rejected Charney's appeal on May 23, 2018.
