= Linda McClain =

American law professor (born 1958)

- Born: 1958 (age 67–68)
- Education: Oberlin College; University of Chicago (MA); Georgetown University (JD); New York University (LLM)
- Occupation: Professor
- Employer: Boston University
- Spouse: James E. Fleming (m.1992-present)

Linda C. McClain (born 1958) is the Robert B. Kent Professor of Law at Boston University School of Law. Her scholarship focuses largely on the roles of individuals and families in the democratic process. Her work crosses various areas of law, including family law, gender equality, and feminist legal theory. McClain is noted for her liberal feminist approach to major social, legal, and political questions.

== Education ==
McClain graduated with a Bachelor of Arts in Religion and Government from Oberlin College in 1980. She continued her education at the University of Chicago Divinity School, graduating with a master's degree in religious studies. In 1985, McClain graduated cum laude from Georgetown University Law Center, where she received her Juris Doctor. While there, she was an editor for The Georgetown Law Journal.

== Career ==
McClain was admitted to the New York State Bar Association in 1986. Upon graduation, McClain worked as an attorney in the litigation department at Cravath, Swaine & Moore and earned her LL.M. from New York University School of Law in 1991.

In 1993, McClain served as a visiting associate professor at the University of Virginia School of Law, where she taught courses on feminist legal theory and jurisprudence. From 1999 to 2000, she was a faculty fellow at the Harvard University Center for Ethics and the Professions. She served as a visiting professor at Harvard Law School in the winter of 2000, teaching a course on Feminist Jurisprudence.

In 2004, she was appointed the Rivkin Radler Distinguished Professor of Law at the Maurice A. Deane School of Law at Hofstra University. While at Hofstra Law, McClain also served as the co-director of the Institute for the Study of Gender, Law, and Policy from 2005 to 2007.

In spring 2006, McClain worked as a visiting professor at University of Pennsylvania Law School, teaching courses on family law and feminist legal theory.

McClain began teaching at Boston University School of Law in 2007. She also teaches at Boston University College of Arts & Sciences, in the Women's, Gender, & Sexuality Studies Program.

She would later serve as a Laurence S. Rockefeller Fellow at Princeton University’s Center for Human Value from 2016 to 2017.

== Memberships ==
She is a member of the American Law Institute, where she participates in the Members Consultative Group for the Restatement of the Law, Children and the Law. She is also involved with the Council on Contemporary Families, the American Political Science Association, and the American Society for Political and Legal Philosophy.

McClain previously served as chair of the Association of American Law Schools Section on Family and Juvenile Law and on the advisory board for The Feminist Sexual Ethics Project at Brandeis University. She has appeared on C-SPAN and Minnesota Public Radio.

== Scholarship ==
=== Constitutional Theory ===
McClain co-authored work with her husband, James E. Fleming, focusing on traditional liberal rights. In Ordered Liberty: Rights, Responsibilities, and Virtues, they propose a middle ground between liberal, civic republican, communitarian, and progressive approaches. They suggest that government can provide information and support for all options, allowing individuals to reflect and choose.

Some scholars note that differently situated individuals may interpret the same government information differently. They also point out that if government intervention is needed to create conditions for autonomous choice (such as "material and social preconditions for women's equal citizenship"), the government may need to limit others' autonomy. McClain and Fleming's approach assumes individuals will choose to act in society's best interests, but they acknowledge that rights should have limits when stronger competing interests exist. McClain and Fleming examine a line of Supreme Court abortion cases and noted the balancing of individual rights and state interests taking place, not the application of strict scrutiny, intermediate scrutiny, or the rational basis test. When the public is reasonably divided on whether an action, for example, abortion, should be permissible, McClain and Fleming argue that it should be left to individual choice, and McClain has explained that an individual right is necessary to give the individual space to make the important decision autonomously. This line of reasoning sees the Constitution as a living document, changing with the needs of society. Tolerance of different approaches, which McClain has argued should be "toleration as respect" as opposed to grudging tolerance, should only be disrupted if a policy is supported by the best reasons provided through public debate. Individuals engaging in public debate in a "deliberative democracy" should not be focused on imposing their view of what is good on everyone else, but instead seek to achieve a common good. Critics of tolerance argue that it does not provide sufficient guidance and creates tacit approval of actions that have not been considered by society. When discussing constitutional rights, however, freedom is defined as freedom from government action; private actors are still free to disapprove of others' actions.

McClain has noted that public debate can identify the best societal values for democracy and that these values can then be used to comprise civics education required by the state, even if that requirement conflicts with the religious liberty interests of groups (e.g., homeschoolers). One counterargument is whether the government can be trusted to teach these values, especially when they question the wisdom of those in power and the laws as written.

McClain and Fleming have also argued that, when the consequences of not having a choice would negatively impact individuals in a personal way, denying individuals that choice would create moral harm. Prior to the legalization of same-sex marriage in the United States, McClain argued that failure to recognize same-sex marriages was disrespectful to same-sex couples and prevented them from fully functioning in democratic life. Although Fleming and McClain claimed to be advocating political liberalism, critics felt examples in Ordered Liberty pushed beyond the natural understanding of citizenship and into the traditionally more private sphere associated with comprehensive liberalism. Others argued that the examples chosen, primarily in family law and equality cases, lent themselves to autonomy as self-government argument. It is harder to apply the same theory to other rights such as free speech cases involving offensive and disrespectful language or zealous protection of a criminal defendant's procedural rights. Arguments regarding individual rights and autonomy are also difficult to apply in a post Citizens United world where organizations possess constitutional rights.

McClain has also defended liberalism against feminist critique that encouraging autonomy leads to socially disconnected individuals, arguing that, although rights necessarily create some protective space between individuals, liberal theory also allows for inter-dependency that can result in increased individual self-worth and respect amongst individuals.

=== Religious Liberty ===
When different religions proscribe rights and responsibilities associated with marriage, McClain has argued that these religious communities be exempt from secular domestic relations law instead of trying to fit the religious law within state law.

=== Reproductive Rights ===
McClain has examined the language surrounding the decision to have an abortion in legal decisions, noting that when the U.S. Supreme Court listed non-life-threatening reasons for abortion, such as convenience and not wanting children, it implied that the pregnant woman's desires outweighed the fetus's possible life. McClain has also written about how abortion opponents describe the decision to have an abortion as an "irresponsible" choice. McClain rejects this idea, instead saying that many women choose to have an abortion because they believe it would be wrong to bring a child into their current social and economic situation. McClain believes women should have the right to choose abortion in these instances, and she does not believe government should encourage women to refrain from sexual intercourse if they are not prepared to provide for any resulting children. She has examined the description of men as unable to control their sexual urges as a cultural excuse of men's conduct, and rejects that women should be responsible for ensuring men commit to any children resulting from sexual activity by requiring the couple marry before having sex. Don Browning counters that the government encouragement of sexual activity within marriage does not have to burden women with that responsibility, but can move it to the institution of marriage via societal expectations that are placed on both men. McClain, however, believes that American legal and cultural changes have rendered the channeling of sex into marriage obsolete.

McClain believes irresponsible language is also applied to women who choose to give birth. McClain has discussed how descriptions of single mothers, teenage mothers, and mothers receiving welfare as irresponsible have led to beliefs that single mothers are immoral.

McClain has asserted that examining abortion through a relative feminist lens puts abortion rights at risk by encouraging women to be legally required to take on traditional responsibilities.

=== Sex equality ===
McClain has identified religious influences that encourage female submission and considered how government can promote sex equality on a local level, advocating for pro-sex equality public school instruction and required premarital counseling regarding property ownership and domestic violence. Her writings on public education and sex equality also extend to sex education, where she advocates applying the liberal feminist theory of sexuality, which recognizes sexual desire and expression as normal and expects sexual responsibility from all individuals regardless of gender. In addition to teaching responsibility, sex education should strive to foster capacity and equality by covering all types of sexual activity and discussing the societal context of sex, gendered messages that have been internalized, and the "sexual double standard." McClain believes government has an obligation to expose children to teachings that vary from their parents' beliefs to encourage open-mindedness and critical thinking.

McClain has also advocated that governments look beyond marriage and the traditional nuclear family structure when devising programs to help families so that all types of families' needs are recognized and considered important.

McClain has likened the female body to a castle or sanctuary entitled to the utmost privacy protections extended to the home under tort law arguing for increased legal protections for women's sexual autonomy and safety. She has been critical of marital rape exemptions because they disregard women's autonomy, and has not found that husbands' privacy rights justify the exemption or prevent their prosecution for domestic violence.

=== Family law ===
McClain's book, The Place of Families: Fostering Capacity, Equality, and Responsibility, is "a feminist vision of the family in moral terms", and has been placed between critical feminist theories that seek to discontinue government regulation of marriage and those legal scholars, such as Margaret Brinig and Milton Regan, who favor continued state-governed marriage. She states that the institution of marriage should be retained, but that its benefits should be open to more people, even if they do not want to legally marry, and government programs encouraging marriage need to consider how poverty impacts the ability to sustain healthy relationships. Her work emphasizes equality across different family structures as important for society. Whereas other scholars believe social institutions can help families prepare children for democratic participation, McClain, with James Fleming, has expressed concerns about relying on civil society institutions with their agendas for moral education. McClain believes government persuasion is needed to create the appropriate environment by helping working parents through parental leave and subsidies for higher quality care. The subtitle of The Place of Families, "Fostering Capacity, Equality, and Responsibility," outlines the values significant enough to require government action.

Criticism of McClain's work asks how she can argue the government should promote gender equality within families while rejecting state promotion of sexual activity within the confines of marriage. Other government action criticism notes that to create equality among different family types, the government must make up deficits experienced by children due to their parents' sub-optimal decisions, and this support could encourage undesired adult behavior. There is also a question of whether government support can create true equality among different types of families, or whether subsidies create marginalized family groups. Critics also take issue with McClain's use of the moral good to support all families, regardless of makeup, while ignoring empirical evidence of the enhanced premoral goods some family makeups generally bestow on children. McClain addressed this criticism in a subsequent article, where she acknowledged the channelling function of family law, encouraging people to marry, sometimes conflicts with fairness, but that channelling is still a legitimate purpose of family law, and marriage is something individuals in non-traditional families still strive for. Additionally, some of the institutions, such as the Institute for American Values, associated with empirical evidence showing greater benefits to children in families with low-conflict, two married biological parents, were also quick to turn out reports questioning the future of marriage in response to movement in the same-sex marriage debate. She has also responded to empirical evidence that women in "traditional" gender role marriages are more satisfied than women in egalitarian relationships, noting that women in traditional marriages likely have lower expectations that are met, whereas women in egalitarian relationships have higher expectations that are met less often.

McClain has also considered compensation for care work, arguing that raising children well instills traits that allow them to participate in democratic government. She has also examined how women respond to inequality by caring for the disadvantaged, which generates societal value. However, while women have traditionally been the primary caretakers, McClain believes government programming should encourage both genders to engage in this important work. She believes caring for children alone is a valuable contribution to society and has criticized the Personal Responsibility and Work Opportunity Act for requiring paid work contributions in addition to care work. However, McClain's recommendations are not simply compensating parents for the care-taking functions they perform; she has argued that caring for children should be considered a public function that is part of good self-government, and as such, society should do more to support parent education, work-life balance, and employment issues in the child care industry.

=== Tort law ===
Although other legal scholars, such as Leslie Bender, have argued the feminist ethic of care requires a duty to rescue, McClain disagreed, distinguishing the ethic of care from beneficence.

=== Publications list ===
==== Books ====
- Linda C. McClain, Who's the Bigot? Learning from Conflicts over Marriage and Civil Rights Law (2020).
- Douglas E. Abrams, Naomi R. Cahn, Catherine J. Ross & Linda C. McClain, Contemporary Family Law (5th ed. 2019).
- James E. Fleming, Sotirios A. Barber, Stephen Macedo & Linda C. McClain, Gay Rights and the Constitution (2016).
- Douglas E. Abrams, Naomi R. Cahn, Catherine J. Ross, David D. Meyer & Linda C. McClain, Contemporary Family Law (4th ed. 2015).
- James E. Fleming & Linda C. McClain, Ordered Liberty: Rights, Responsibilities, and Virtues (2013).
- What is Parenthood? Contemporary Debates about the Family (eds. Linda C. McClain & Daniel Cere, 2013).
- Gender Equality: Dimensions of Women's Equal Citizenship (eds. Linda C. McClain & Joanna L. Grossman, 2009).
- Linda C. McClain, The Place of Families: Fostering Capacity, Equality, and Responsibility (2006).

==== Most-cited articles ====
According to Google Scholar, HeinOnline, and Web of Science, McClain's most-cited articles include:

- Atomistic Man Revisited: Liberalism, Connection, and Feminist Jurisprudence, 65 S. Cal. L. Rev. 1171 (1992).
- "Irresponsible" Reproduction, 47 Hastings L.J. 339 (1996).
- Rights and Irresponsibility, 43 Duke L.J. 989 (1993).
- Inviolability and Privacy: The Castle, the Sanctuary, and the Body, 7 Yale J.L. & Human. 195 (1995).
