= Rick Hess =

Rick Hess could refer to:

- Richard Hess (born 1954), American Old Testament scholar
- Frederick M. Hess (born 1968), American education writer
