= James E. Fleming =

American lawyer (born 1954)

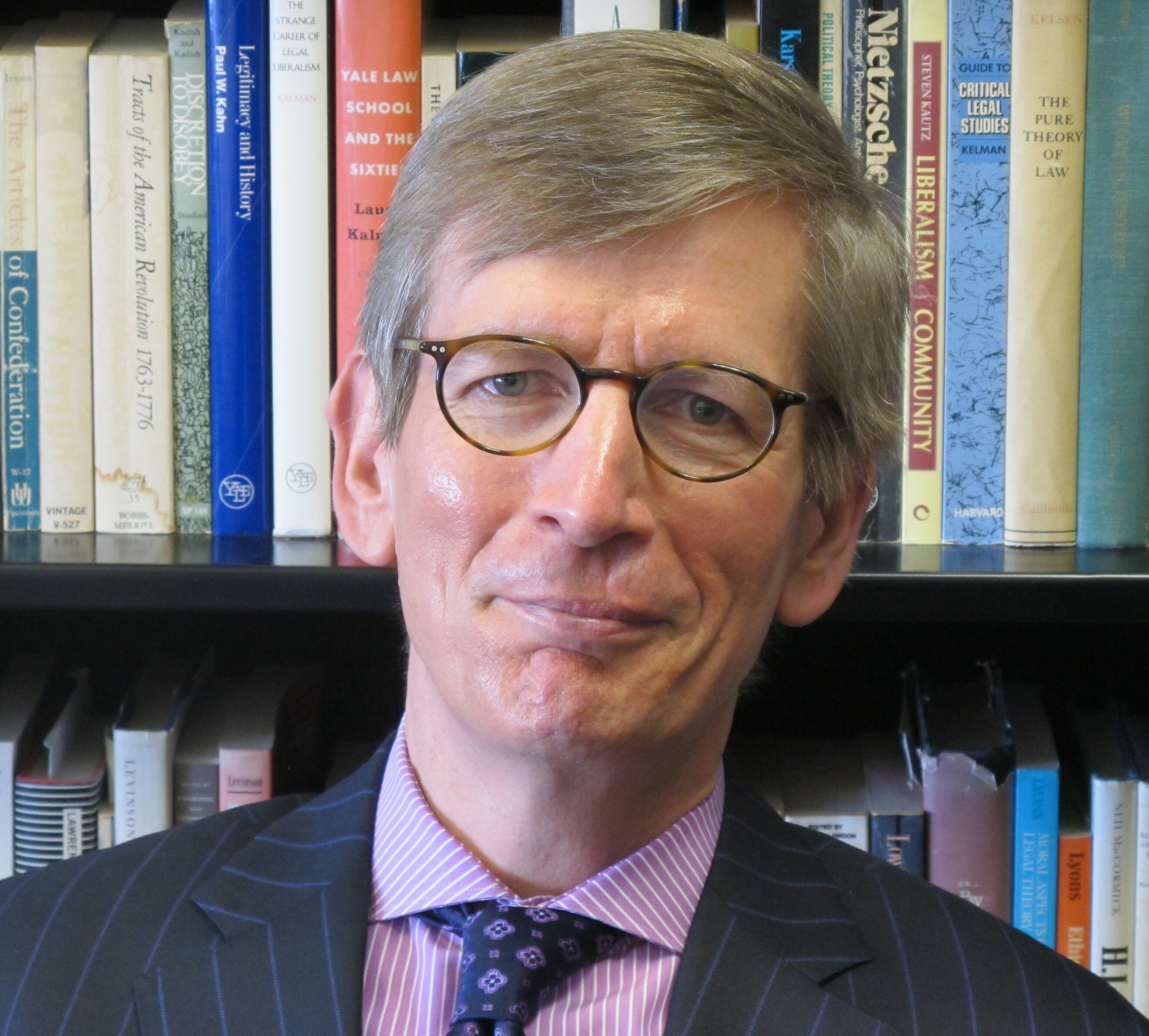
- Fleming in 2012
- Born: 1954 (age 71–72)
- Spouse: Linda C. McClain (m. 1992)
- Children: 2

Academic background
- Education: University of Missouri (BA); Harvard University (JD); Princeton University (MA, PhD)
- Thesis: Constitutional Constructivism (1988)
- Doctoral advisor: Walter F. Murphy
- Other advisor: Sanford Levinson
- Influences: Sandel; Rawls; Ely; Dworkin

Academic work
- Discipline: Constitutional theory
- Institutions: Fordham University; Boston University; American Society for Political and Legal Philosophy

James E. Fleming is an American legal scholar who serves as the Paul J. Liacos professor of law at the Boston University School of Law. He is a scholar in standard constitutional theory and constitutional interpretation, with special attention to criticizing originalism and defending moral readings of the U.S. Constitution, developing a civic liberalism concerned with protecting rights and instilling civic virtues, and justifying rights to autonomy and equality as central to constitutional self-government.

== Early life and education ==
Fleming received a Bachelor of Arts in political science from the University of Missouri in 1977. He earned his J.D. from Harvard Law School in 1985. At Harvard, he was a teaching fellow for Michael Sandel. He then attended Princeton University, earning a master's degree and, in 1988, completed a Ph.D. in politics with the dissertation, "Constitutional Constructivism," under the supervision of Walter F. Murphy and Sanford Levinson.

In his dissertation, Fleming developed a constitutional constructivism analogous to John Rawls's political constructivism. Before becoming a law professor, Fleming was an attorney in the litigation department at Cravath, Swaine & Moore in New York City from 1986 to 1991.

== Academic career ==
Fleming taught at Fordham University School of Law from 1991 to 2007, and was appointed the Leonard F. Manning distinguished professor of law in 2006. He joined the faculty of Boston University School of Law in 2007 as The Honorable Frank R. Kenison distinguished scholar, and was appointed The Honorable Paul J. Liacos professor of law in 2015. He has served as associate dean for intellectual life at Boston University School of Law and is the faculty advisor for the Boston University Law Review.

At Fordham and Boston University, Fleming has organized, co-organized and published numerous conference volumes in constitutional theory and legal philosophy, including volumes on the work of John Rawls and Ronald Dworkin.

Fleming was the Editor of Nomos, the annual book of the American Society for Political and Legal Philosophy. In that capacity, he published four interdisciplinary volumes with New York University Press: Nomos L: Getting to the Rule of Law (2011); Nomos LII: Evolution and Morality (with Sanford Levinson) (2012); Nomos LIII: Passions and Emotions (2013); and Nomos LV: Federalism and Subsidiarity (with Jacob T. Levy) (2014). He has also served as the society's president and as of June 2021, is the secretary-treasurer.
