= Kelly D. Patterson =

Kelly D. Patterson (born 1958) is a professor of political science at Brigham Young University (BYU) and a senior research fellow with the Center for the Study of Elections Democracy at that school.

Patterson has a bachelor's and master's degree from BYU. He also has a Ph.D. from Columbia University. From 1988 until 1993 Patterson taught at Franklin and Marshall College. In 1993 Patterson returned to BYU as a professor.

From 1998-2004 Patterson was the chair of the BYU Department of Political Science. He is the author of Political Parties and the Maintenance of Liberal Democracy (Columbia University Press, 1996). Patterson has also written many papers including many with J. Quin Monson and David B. Magleby. One of Patterson's articles was included in a list of the top ten most cited articles in PS Political Science & Politics.

Patterson and his wife Jeanene are the parents of two children.

== Sources ==
- short bio of Patterson
- Patterson's vita
