= Constitutional theory =

Area of constitutional law

Constitutional theory is an area of constitutional law that focuses on the underpinnings of constitutional government. It overlaps with legal theory, constitutionalism, philosophy of law and democratic theory. It is not limited by country or jurisdiction.

== German Rechtsstaat ==
The Rechtsstaat doctrine (Legal state, State of Right, Constitutional state, constitutional government) was introduced in the latest works of the German philosopher Immanuel Kant (1724–1804) after US and French constitutions were adopted in the late 18th century. Kant's approach is based on the supremacy of a country's written constitution. This supremacy must create guarantees for implementation of his central idea: a permanent peaceful life as a basic condition for the happiness of its people and their prosperity. Kant was basing his doctrine on none other but constitutionalism and constitutional government.

Kant had thus formulated the main problem of constitutionalism, "The constitution of a state is eventually based on the morals of its citizens, which, in its turns, is based on the goodness of this constitution." Kant's idea is the foundation for the constitutional theory of the twenty-first century. The Legal state concept is based on the ideas, discovered by Immanuel Kant, for example, in his Groundwork of the Metaphysic of Morals: "The task of establishing a universal and permanent peaceful life is not only a part of theory of law within the framework of pure reason, but per se an absolute and ultimate goal. To achieve this goal, a state must become the community of a large number of people, living provided with legislative guarantees of their property rights secured by a common constitution. The supremacy of this constitution… must be derived a priori from the considerations for achievement of the absolute ideal in the most just and fair organization of people’s life under the aegis of public law."

== Russian legal state ==
The Russian legal system, borne out of transformations in the 19th century under the judicial reform of Alexander II, is based primarily upon the German legal tradition. It was from here that Russia borrowed a doctrine of Rechtsstaat, which literally translates as Legal State. The English most close analogue is «rule of law». Rechtsstaat is a concept in continental European legal thinking, originally borrowed from German legal philosophy, which can be translated as “legal state” or "state of law", or "state of rights", "constitutional state" in which the exercise of governmental power is constrained by the law. The Russian Legal state concept adopts the written constitution as a supreme law of the country (the rule of constitution). The concept of “legal state” (“pravovoe gosudarstvo” in Russian) is a fundamental, but undefined, principle that appears in the very first dispositive provision of Russia's post-Communist constitution: “The Russian Federation – Russia – constitutes a democratic federative legal state with a republican form of governance.” Similarly, the very first dispositive provision of the Constitution of Ukraine declares: “Ukraine is a sovereign and independent, democratic, social, legal state.” The effort to give meaning to definition “Legal State” is anything but theoretical.

Valery Zorkin, President of the Constitutional Court of Russia, wrote in 2003: “Becoming a legal state has long been our ultimate goal, and we have certainly made serious progress in this direction over the past several years. However, no one can say now that we have reached this destination. Such a Legal state simply cannot exist without a lawful and just society. Here, as in no other sphere of our life, the state reflects the level of maturity reached by society.".

The Russian concept of legal state adopted many segments of the constitutional economics. One of the founders of constitutional economics James M. Buchanan, the 1986 recipient of the Nobel Memorial Prize in Economic Sciences argues that in the framework of constitutional government any governmental interventions and regulations have been based on three assumptions.

- First, every failure of the market economy to function smoothly and perfectly can be corrected by governmental intervention.
- Second, those holding political office and manning the bureaucracies are altruistic upholders of the public interest, unconcerned with their own personal economic well-being.
- And, third, changing the responsibilities of government towards more intervention and control will not profoundly and perversely affect the social and economic life.

== United States ==
Constitutional theory in the United States is an academic discipline that focuses on the meaning of the United States Constitution. Its concerns include (but are not limited to) the historical, linguistic, sociological, ethical, and political aspects.

Much of constitutional theory is concerned with theories of judicial review. This is in part because Marbury v. Madison, which established this judicial power in the early 19th century, has given the judiciary near-final authority on constitutional meaning.

Aside from judicial review, constitutional theory in general seeks to ask and answer the following questions:

- How should the Constitution be interpreted?
- How much weight should be given to the history of the Constitution's framing?
- How much, if any, of the Constitution's meaning can be read as implicit in the text?
- What vision of republican government does the Constitution seek to further?
- How does constitutional meaning shift with other changes in the political structure?
- How does constitutional meaning shift with changes in cultural norms?
- What is the proper relationship between individual rights and state power?
- What is the proper relationship between the branches of government
  - This question involves the power of judicial review, noted above
- What is the proper relationship between the federal government and the states?

Although constitutional theory as a discipline has its precursors in The Federalist and Justice Story's Commentaries on the Constitution, modern constitutional theory began with the publication of Alexander Bickel's The Least Dangerous Branch. (The title is an allusion to The Federalist No. 78, in which Alexander Hamilton wrote that the judiciary "will always be the least dangerous to the political rights of the Constitution", because it has neither the sword (like the Executive) nor the purse (like the Legislature). The book's primary (but not sole) contribution was to introduce the idea of the "countermajoritarian difficulty." The idea expressed by the term countermajoritarian difficulty is that there is a tension between democratic government (as he defines it democratic government is majoritarian government) and judicial power. If the judiciary—an unelected branch of government—can overturn popular legislation, then either there is a fundamental contradiction within the democratic system, or there is a tension that must be resolved by curbing judicial power. (One of Bickel's solutions is for the Court to exercise "the passive virtues": that is, to decline to decide more than it has to decide.)

== Important theorists ==
The following is a partial list of important American theorists and thinkers:

- Bruce Ackerman, Professor of Law, Yale University. Primary contributions: We the People: Foundations and We the People: Transformations.
- Jack Balkin, Professor of Law, Yale University
- Charles A. Beard, Professor of Sociology, New School for Social Research, Primary contributions: An Economic Interpretation of the Constitution
- Randy Barnett, Professor of Law, Georgetown University
- Alexander Bickel, former Yale professor who published The Least Dangerous Branch, The Morality of Consent, The Supreme Court and the Idea of Progress, among other works.
- Erwin Chemerinsky, Dean, University of California, Irvine School of Law
- Ronald Dworkin, Professor of Law, New York University School of Law
- Christopher Eisgruber, President, Princeton University
- John Hart Ely, Scholar and former professor at several leading law schools.
- James E. Fleming, Professor of Law, Boston University.
- Alex Kozinski, Judge on the U.S. Court of Appeals for the Ninth CircuitState (polity)
- Sanford Levinson, Professor of Law and Government, University of Texas at Austin
- Walter F. Murphy McCormick Professor of Jurisprudence, Princeton University
- Richard Posner, Senior Judge on the U.S. Court of Appeals for the Seventh Circuit
- Robert Post, professor of law at Yale Law School
- Richard Primus, Professor of Law University of Michigan Law School
- Lawrence G. Sager, Professor of Law University of Texas at Austin
- Antonin Scalia, Associate Justice of the Supreme Court. His ideas on originalism published in A Matter of Interpretation.
- Suzanna Sherry, Professor of Law, Vanderbilt University Law School. Primary contributions: Desperately Seeking Certainty: The Misguided Quest for Constitutional Foundations and Beyond All Reason: The Radical Assault on Truth in American Law (both with Daniel Farber of Boalt Hall).
- Lawrence Solum. Professor of Law, University of Virginia School of Law
- Cass Sunstein, Professor of Law, Harvard University
- William Howard Taft (b. 1858 - d. 1930), 10th Chief Justice of the United States (1921–1930); 27th President of the United States (1909–1913); Kent Professor of Constitutional Law and Legal History, Yale Law School, Yale University (1913–1921); Dean and Professor of Law, University of Cincinnati Law School; Solicitor General of the United States
- Laurence Tribe, Professor of Law, Harvard University Law School
- Jeffrey K. Tulis. Professor of Government and Law, University of Texas at Austin
- William Van Alstyne, Professor of Law, College of William & Mary

== See also ==
- Constitutionalism
- Constitutional law
- Constitutional economics
- Legal reform
- Rule of law
- Rule According to Higher Law
- Philosophy of law
