= Judith N. Shklar =

American political theorist (1928–1992)

- Born: Judita Nisse; September 24, 1928; Riga, Latvia
- Died: September 17, 1992 (aged 63); Cambridge, Massachusetts, U.S.

Academic background
- Education: McGill University (BA, MA); Radcliffe College (PhD)
- Thesis: Fate and Futility: Two Themes in Contemporary Political Theory (1955)

Judith Nisse Shklar (September 24, 1928 – September 17, 1992) was a Latvian-born American philosopher and political theorist who studied the history of political thought, notably that of the Enlightenment period. She was appointed the John Cowles Professor of Government at Harvard University in 1980.

== Biography ==
Judith Shklar was born as Judita Nisse (Latvian: Judīte Nisse) in Riga, Latvia, to Jewish Latvian parents. Because of persecution during World War II, in 1940 her family fled Europe via the Soviet Union and Japan to the US and finally to Canada in 1941, when she was thirteen. She began her studies at McGill University at the age of 16, receiving bachelor of arts and master of arts degrees in 1949 and 1950, respectively. She later recalled that the entrance rules to McGill at the time required 750 points for Jews and 600 for everyone else. She took her PhD degree from Radcliffe College in 1955. Her mentor was the famous political theorist Carl Joachim Friedrich, who, she later recalled, only ever offered her one compliment: "Well, this isn't the usual thesis, but then I did not expect it to be." Eventually she became his successor.

Shklar joined the Harvard faculty in 1956, becoming the first woman to receive tenure in Harvard's Government Department in 1971. During her first year in the job, the Department permitted her to stay at home with her first child while writing her first book. When it came time for her tenure decision, the Department dithered, so Shklar proposed a half-time appointment with effective tenure and the title of lecturer, partly because she had three children by then. In 1980, she was appointed as John Cowles Professor of Government. Her friend and colleague Stanley Hoffmann once remarked, "she was by far the biggest star of the department." Hoffmann also called her "the most devastatingly intelligent person I ever knew here."

During her career, Shklar served in various academic and professional capacities. For example, she was active in the committee that integrated the American Repertory Theater into the Harvard community.

A renowned teacher and advisor, many of Shklar's former students and colleagues contributed to a volume of essays, Liberalism without Illusions: Essays on Liberal Theory and the Political Vision of Judith N. Shklar (University of Chicago Press, 1996), edited by Bernard Yack. Contributors include her celebrated former students Amy Gutmann, Patrick T. Riley, Nancy L. Rosenblum, Bernard Yack, Rogers Smith, Melissa Williams, and Tracy B. Strong.

Throughout her life, Judith Shklar was known as "Dita." She and her husband, Gerald Shklar, had three children, David, Michael, and Ruth.

== Views ==
Shklar's thought centered on two main ideas: cruelty as the worst evil and the "liberalism of fear." She discusses the first idea in her essay "Putting Cruelty First," published in Daedalus (1982), and in Ordinary Vices (1984). Her second main idea, expounded in her essay "The Liberalism of Fear," is founded on the first idea and focuses on how governments are prone to abuse the "inevitable inequalities in power" that result from political organization.

Based on these core ideas, Shklar advocated constitutional democracy, which she saw as flawed but still the best form of government possible. A constitutional democracy, in Shklar's view, protects people from the abuses of the more powerful by restricting government and by dispersing power among a "multiplicity of politically active groups". Her concern for possible governmental abuse stemmed from her focus on ordinary citizens instead of institutions and elites, since it is the average person who faces the brunt of institutional evil and injustice.

Shklar believed that "the original and only defensible meaning of liberalism" is that "every adult should be able to make as many effective decisions without fear or favor about as many aspects of his or her life as is compatible with the like freedom of every adult." Shklar described rights less as absolute moral liberties and more as licenses which citizens must have in order to protect themselves against abuse.

Shklar was deeply interested in injustice and political evils, claiming that "philosophy fails to give injustice its due"; that is, most past philosophers have ignored injustice and talked only about justice, likewise ignoring vice and talking only about virtue. Instead, Shklar's writing avoided justice and virtue and focused on evil, fear, or injustice. Ordinary Vices and The Faces of Injustice articulate Shklar's attempts to fill this gap in philosophical thought, drawing heavily on literature as well as philosophy to argue that injustice and the "sense of injustice" are historically and culturally universal and are critical concepts for modern political and philosophical theory.

In Men and Citizens, Shklar examined the tension between individual freedom and the demands of political community in Rousseau's thought. She considered the Spartan fatherland to represent one of Rousseau's two competing ideals, in which his concept of the General will found its most proximate realization. Shklar contrasted this Spartan model of civic unity with Rousseau's notion of the "Age of Gold," characterized by natural independence and simplicity.

== Awards and honors ==
She became a fellow of the American Academy of Arts and Sciences in 1970 and a member of the American Philosophical Society in 1990. She served as president of the American Society for Political and Legal Philosophy (1982) and then as vice president of the American Political Science Association (1983). While serving as the vice president of the APSA, she was also the visiting Pitt Professor of American History and Institutions at Cambridge University (1983–1984). In 1984, she received a MacArthur Fellowship for her work. She served as a visiting fellow at All Souls College, Oxford University, in 1983 and 1986. Following this, she was the Carlyle Lecturer at Oxford in 1986; Storrs Lecturer, Yale Law School, 1988; Tanner Lecturer, University of Utah, 1989; and Charles Homer Haskins Lecturer of the American Council of Learned Societies, 1989. Also in 1989, she was elected the first female president of the APSA.

In 1985 the Harvard University chapter of Phi Beta Kappa awarded her its teaching prize, calling her "demanding, rewarding, forthright, fair, and reasonable, a model of intellectual and human qualities rarely combined."

== In popular culture ==
Shklar's Ordinary Vices is referenced in the American television series The Good Place, serving as an inspiration for a well-ordered society.

== Works ==
Shklar wrote many influential books and articles on political science, including the following:

- After Utopia: The Decline of Political Faith (Princeton University Press, 1957) – Analysis of the decline of political philosophy in the nineteenth and twentieth centuries
- Legalism: Law, Morals, and Political Trials (Harvard University Press, 1964) – A look into political theory and jurisprudence, thereby analyzing legalism
- Men and Citizens: A Study of Rousseau's Social Theory (Cambridge University Press, 1969) – A close look at Rousseau and his social theory
- Freedom and Independence: A Study of the Political Ideas of Hegel's Phenomenology of Mind (Cambridge University Press, 1976) – A close look at Hegel's Phenomenology of the Mind
- Ordinary Vices (Belknap Press of Harvard University Press, 1984) – A collection of six essays on the ordinary vices of cruelty, hypocrisy, snobbery, betrayal, and misanthropy.
- Montesquieu (Oxford University Press, 1987) – An introduction to the thought of Montesquieu
- The Faces of Injustice (Yale University Press, 1990) – Three essays on injustice: "Giving Injustice Its Due," "Misfortune and Injustice," and "The Sense of Injustice."
- American Citizenship: The Quest for Inclusion (Harvard University Press, 1991) – A look at what constitutes American citizenship.
- On Political Obligation (Yale University Press, 2019) – A series of lectures published posthumously by Samantha Ashenden and Andreas Hess.

Several of her essays, including the "classic" "The Liberalism of Fear," have been collected in two posthumous volumes edited by Stanley Hoffmann and published by the University of Chicago Press: Redeeming American Political Thought (1998) and Political Thought and Political Thinkers (1998).
