= Catherine J. Ross =

Catherine J. Ross (born December 27, 1949) is the Lyle T. Alverson Professor of Law Emerita at The George Washington University Law School. She is a constitutional law expert specializing in the First Amendment and civil liberties more generally as well as family law and issues affecting children and families including education and child custody.

== Education and career ==
Ross was in the first class of women to graduate from Yale College in 1971. She went on to earn her Ph.D. (in History) and J.D. from Yale University.

Catherine J. Ross
- Born: 1949 (age 76–77)
- Relatives: Henry Rosovsky (paternal uncle)

Academic background
- Education: Yale University B.A., PhD (in History), J.D.

Academic work
- Discipline: Constitutional Law
- Institutions: George Washington University Law School
- Notable works: A Right to Lie? Presidents, Other Liars, and the First Amendment; Lessons in Censorship: How Schools and Courts Subvert Students' First Amendment Rights
- Website: https://catherinejrosslawprof.com/

She began her legal career in a litigation role at Paul, Weiss, Rifkind, Wharton & Garrison, where she won major impact litigation on behalf of the homeless population.

As an elected Fellow of the American Bar Foundation, Ross, with A. Leon Higginbotham Jr., was a co-Chair of the ABA's Steering Committee on the Unmet Needs of Children and resulting landmark report "America’s Children at Risk," which was presented at the White House in 1993. She later turned to academia, and has since held positions at Boston College and St. John's University School of Law. In 1996, she joined the George Washington University Law School faculty, where she was named Lyle T. Alverson Professor of Law in 2016.

Ross was a Member of the School of Social Science at the Institute for Advanced Study from 2008-2009.

In 2015, Ross published the prize-winning Lessons in Censorship: How Schools and Courts Subvert Students' First Amendment Rights (Harvard University Press). In 2021, she published a second book on the first amendment, titled A Right to Lie? Presidents, Other Liars, and the First Amendment.

As a leading expert on campus speech issues in both K-12 and colleges and universities, Ross is widely quoted in the media (both in the U.S and abroad). She has published op-eds including in the Washington Post and USA Today.

Ross served on the legal advisory board of Impeach Donald Trump Now, and the legal advisory board of Free Speech for People. She has lectured widely and responded to press inquiries in the U.S. and abroad on the grounds and process for impeachment of a president.

== Publications ==
=== Books ===
- A Right to Lie? Presidents, Other Liars, and the First Amendment (University of Pennsylvania Press, 2021).
- Lessons in Censorship: How Schools and Courts Subvert Students' First Amendment Rights (Harvard University Press, 2015).
- Contemporary Family Law, 1st (2006) through 5th editions (2019) (with Douglas E. Abrams, Naomi R. Cahn, David D. Meyer, & Linda C. McClain; Thomson West).
- America's Children at Risk: An Agenda for Legal Action (report of the ABA Working Groups on the Unmet Legal Needs of Children and their Families; American Bar Association Press, 1993).
- Child Abuse: An Agenda for Action (Oxford University Press, 1980; co-editor with George Gerbner and Edward Zigler).
