= Melissa Williams (political scientist) =

American academic (born 1960)

Melissa S. Williams
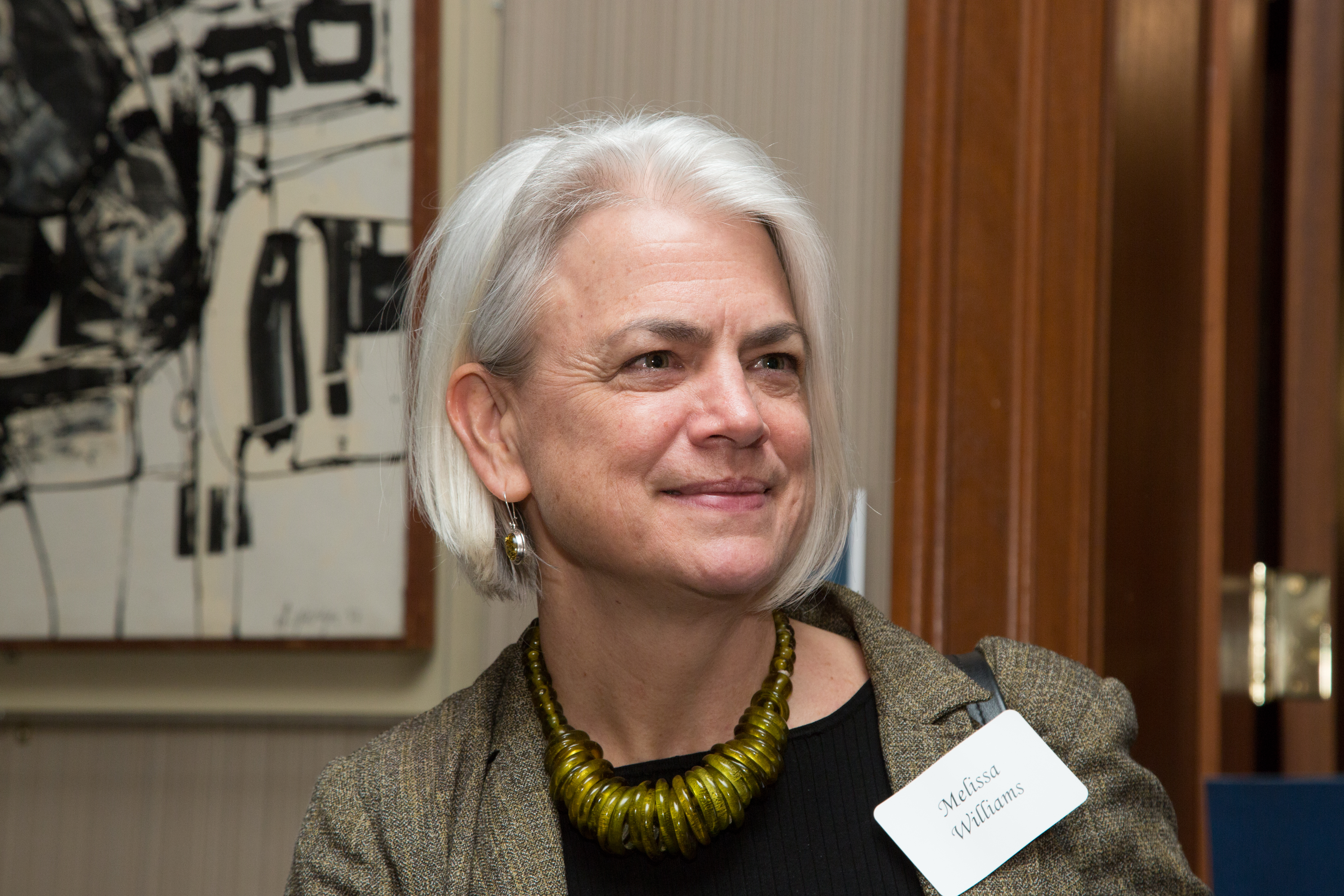
- Williams in 2017
- Born: 1960 (age 65–66)
- Occupations: Professor, academic, author
- Awards: Leo Strauss Award

Academic background
- Education: Bryn Mawr College (MESc); Harvard University (AM, PhD)
- Thesis: Voice, trust and memory : marginalized groups and the failings of liberal representation (1993)
- Doctoral advisors: Judith N. Shklar, Dennis F. Thompson

Academic work
- Discipline: Political theory
- Sub-discipline: Democratic theory, comparative political theory, history of political thought
- Institutions: University of Toronto

Melissa S. Williams (born 1960) is an American political theorist who is a Professor at the University of Toronto. She specialises in democratic theory and comparative political theory. She was the founding director of the University of Toronto's Centre for Ethics.

She gained an MESc from Bryn Mawr College and AM and PhD degrees from Harvard University. Her doctoral advisers were Judith Shklar and Dennis F. Thompson. Her PhD thesis won the American Political Science Association's Leo Strauss Award.

A major work is the book Voice, Trust, and Memory: Marginalized Groups and the Failings of Liberal Representation, published by Princeton University Press (1998), which won a First Book Award in political theory or political philosophy from the American Political Science Association in 1999. She has been editor of the journal NOMOS of the American Society for Political and Legal Philosophy.

== Selected publications ==
Books

- Melissa S. Williams. Voice, Trust, and Memory: Marginalized Groups and the Failings of Liberal Representation (Princeton University Press; 1998, 2000) ISBN 9780691057385
- David Kahane, Daniel Weinstock, Dominique Leydet, Melissa Williams, eds. Deliberative Democracy in Practice (University of British Columbia Press; 2010) ISBN 0774859083
- Melissa Williams. Equality: A Critical Introduction (Routledge; 2014) ISBN 978-0415242011
- Joseph Chan, Doh Chull Shin, Melissa S. Williams, eds. East Asian Perspectives on Political Legitimacy: Bridging the Empirical-Normative Divide (Cambridge University Press; 2016) doi:10.1017/CBO9781316466896

Essays and research papers

- Melissa S. Williams (1995). Justice toward groups: Political not juridical. Political Theory 23: 67–91 doi:10.1177/0090591795023001005
- Melissa S. Williams. "Citizenship as Identity, Citizenship as Shared Fate, and the Functions of Multicultural Education" in Kevin McDonough, Walter Feinberg (eds), Citizenship and Education in Liberal-Democratic Societies: Teaching for Cosmopolitan Values and Collective Identities (Oxford University Press; 2003) doi:10.1093/0199253668.003.0009
