= Patrick T. Riley =

Political science professor (1941–2015)

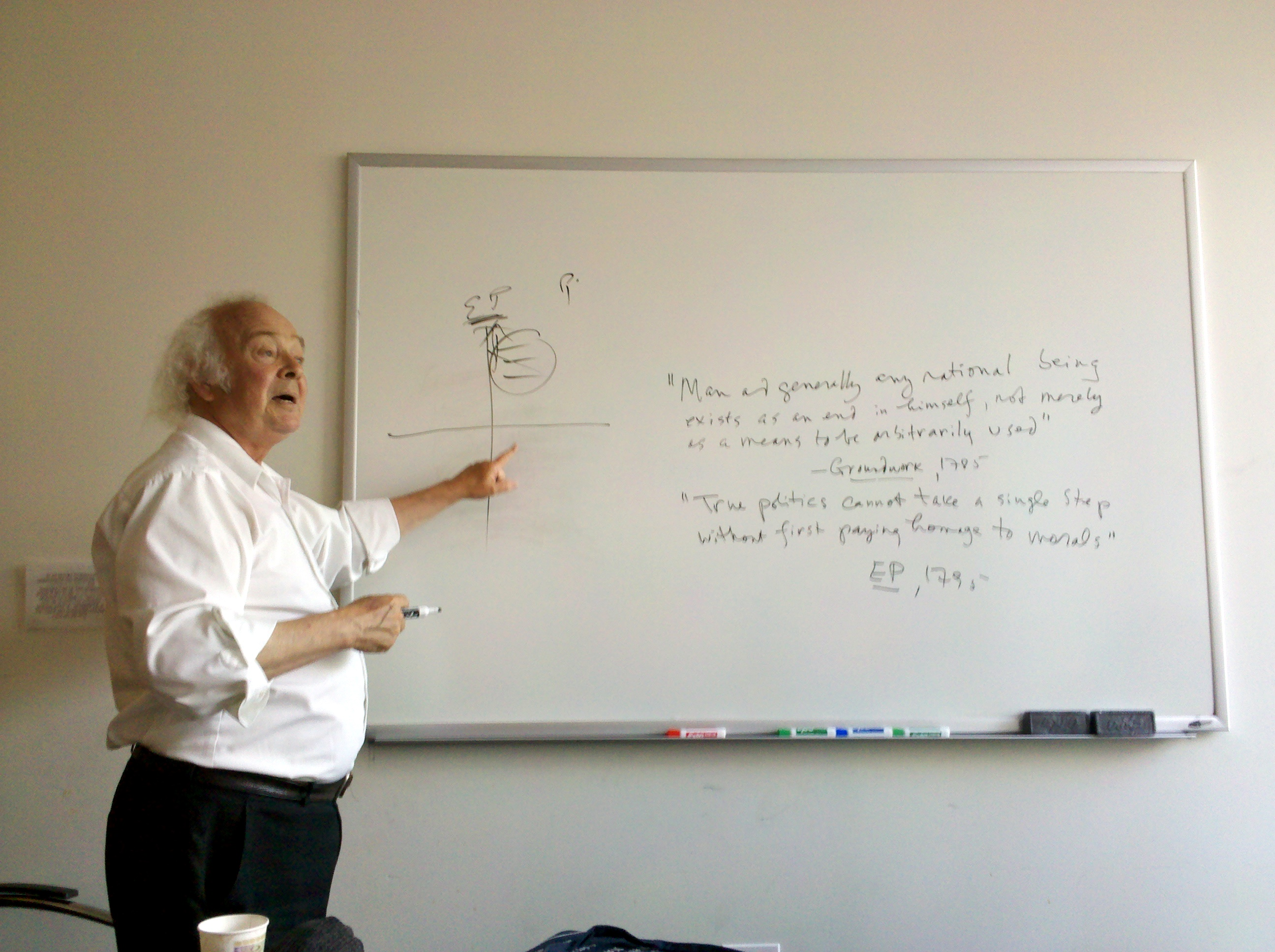
Professor Riley at Harvard

Patrick Thomas Riley (October 27, 1941 – March 10, 2015) was Michael Oakeshott Professor of Political Science at the University of Wisconsin-Madison. He is notable for his translations of the political writings of Gottfried Leibniz and his research on social contract theory, the general will, and the history of universal jurisprudence.

== Life and career ==
Riley received his undergraduate degree from Claremont Men's College. He then briefly pursued a career as a conductor, studying at the Mozarteum in Salzburg, Austria. Shortly thereafter, he earned his MPhil at The London School of Economics under the supervision of Michael Oakeshott. In 1968, he received his Ph.D. from Harvard University where he studied under Louis Hartz, John Rawls and Judith Shklar. While at Harvard, Riley won the Bowdoin Essay Prize for Graduate Students in 1966 and 1967.

Riley's first book, Will and Political Legitimacy, offered "a critical exposition of social contract theory in Hobbes, Locke, Rousseau, Kant, and Hegel." In Leibniz' Universal Jurisprudence: Justice as the Charity of the Wise, Riley detailed the social, moral, and political philosophy of Leibniz, arguing for the English-speaking world that Leibniz was the most important German philosopher before Kant. He has also written extensively on the general will of Rousseau and Kant's political philosophy. He was the author of The General Will before Rousseau: The Transformation of the Divine into the Civic and the editor of the Cambridge Companion to Rousseau. Riley edited a volume of Leibniz's political writings, as well as produced translations of Malebranche, Bossuet and Fénelon for Cambridge University Press.

== Final years ==
After teaching at Harvard for several years, he moved to teach at the University of Wisconsin-Madison, where he retired from in 2007 after 36 years of teaching. In October 2008, a General Will Symposium was held on campus to honor Riley's career, including numerous former colleagues and students from throughout his career, which was subsequently published by Cambridge University Press as The General Will: The Evolution of a Concept, edited by James Farr and David Lay Williams, and it features two of Riley's essays. In 2011, the Leibniz Review was dedicated to Riley's career and his numerous contributions to the journal over an extended period. The volume included David Lay Williams's tribute to Riley's interpretation of Leibniz as a philosopher of love, as well as an account of Riley's own commitment to charity as a way of life. In retirement, Riley taught courses at Harvard near his home in Cambridge, Massachusetts.
