= Bernard Yack =

Canadian-born American political theorist

Bernard Yack (born 1952) is a Canadian-born American political theorist.

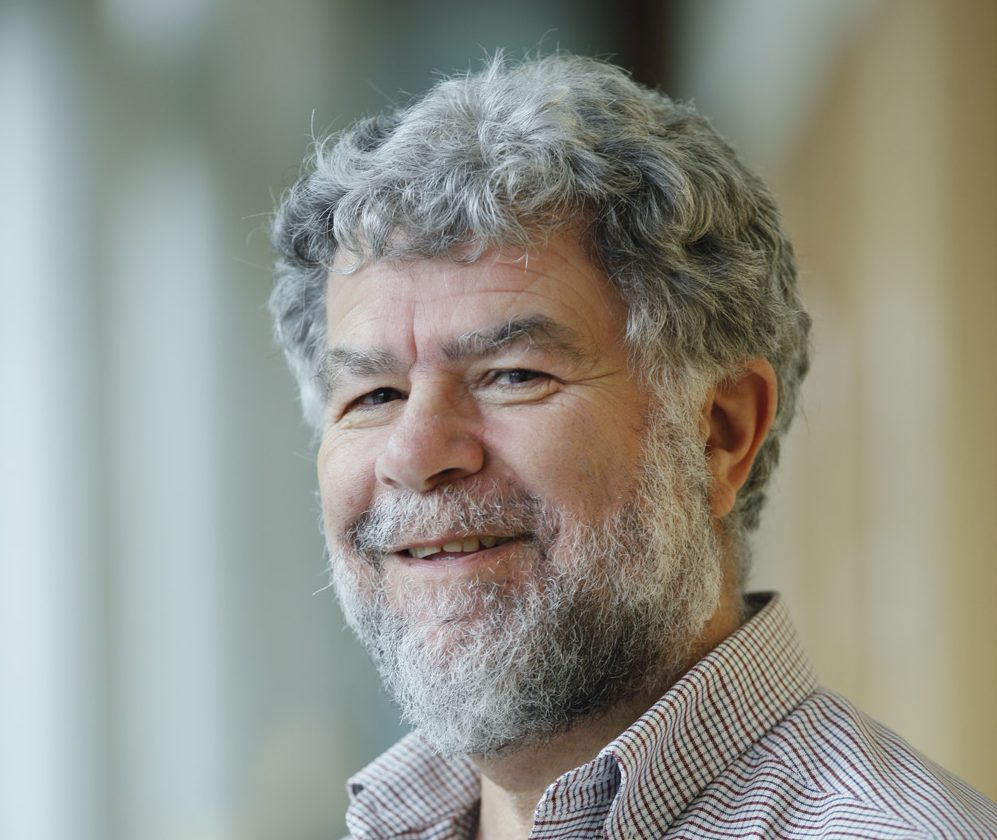
Bernard Yack

He received his B.A. from the University of Toronto and his Ph.D. in Philosophy from Harvard University, where he was a student of Judith Shklar. Yack has taught at numerous universities including Princeton University and the University of Wisconsin–Madison. He is the author of works of political and social philosophy such as The Problems of a Political Animal, and The Longing for Total Revolution: The Philosophic Sources of Social Discontent from Rousseau to Marx and Nietzsche. His most recent book is titled Nationalism and the Moral Psychology of Community. He is currently the Lerman Neubauer Professor of Democracy and Public Policy at Brandeis University.

In 1999–2000, Yack was a Residential Fellow at the Swedish Collegium for Advanced Study in Uppsala, Sweden.

== Selected publications ==
- Yack, Bernard (1993). The Problems of a Political Animal: Community, Conflict, and Justice in Aristotelian Political Thought. Oakland, CA: University of California Press. ISBN 9780520081673.
- Yack, Bernard (1996). Liberalism without Illusions: Essays on Liberal Theory and the Political Vision of Judith N. Shklar. Oakland, CA: University of California Press. ISBN 9780226944708.
- Yack, Bernard (1997). The Fetishism of Modernities: Epochal Self-Consciousness in Contemporary Social and Political Thought. Notre Dame, Indiana: University of Notre Dame Press. ISBN 9780268028503.
- Yack, Bernard (2012). Nationalism and the Moral Psychology of Community. Chicago: University of Chicago Press. ISBN 9780226944685.
- Yack, Bernard (2022). The Longing for Total Revolution: Philosophic Sources of Social Discontent from Rousseau to Marx and Nietzsche. Oakland, CA: University of California Press. ISBN 9780520375871.
