= John C. Green =

American academic

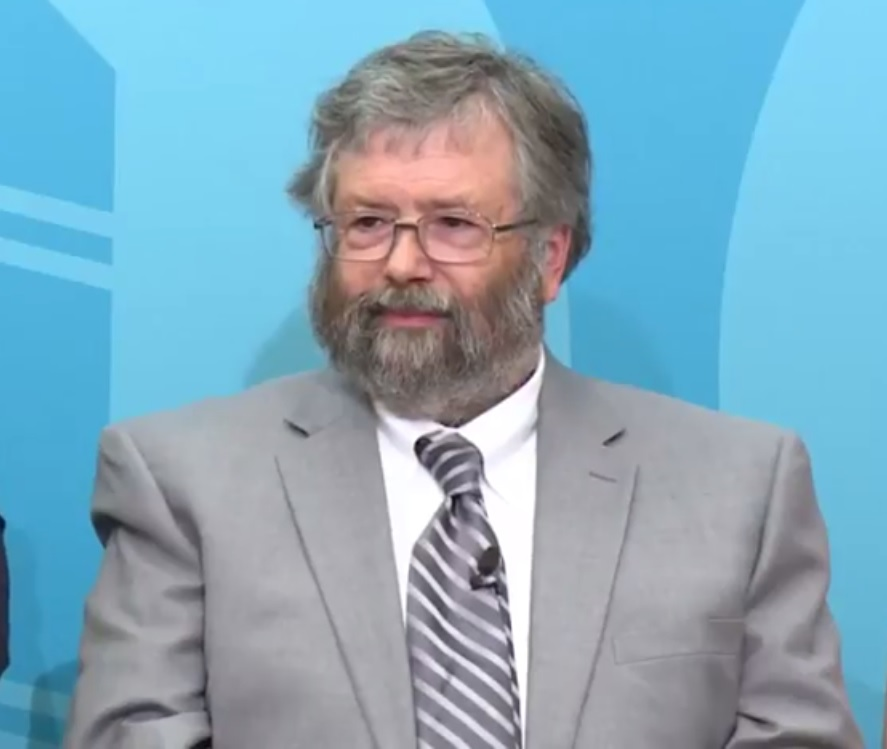

President of the University of Akron Interim
- Incumbent
- Assumed office May 1, 2018

Personal details
- Education: University of Colorado Boulder (B.A.); Cornell University (Ph.D.)
- Occupation: Scholar, Researcher, Academic Administrator

John Clifford Green is an American academic who has written numerous books on the relationship between religion and politics.

== Education ==
John Clifford Green received his Bachelors of Arts degree from the University of Colorado Boulder and his Doctor of Philosophy degree from Cornell University.

== Academic career ==
Green is a scholar, researcher, and director of the Ray C. Bliss Institute of Applied Politics at the University of Akron in Ohio. He is also a Distinguished Professor of Political Science at the University of Akron. His area of research is religion and politics in the U.S. He co-authored the book Mormons and American Politics with Quin Monson and David E. Campbell. He was appointed dean of the Buchtel College of Arts and Sciences by the Board of Trustees on April 19, 2017, after serving as interim dean since October 2015. Following the resignation of The University of Akron's 17th President, Matthew Wilson, Green was named interim president of the university by the Board of Trustees on April 18, 2018. Green's term as interim president began on May 1, 2018, and ended on October 1, 2019.

== Honors ==
Green is a Senior Fellow at the Pew Forum on Religion & Public Life.

== Bibliography ==
- (1991) The Bible and the Ballot Box: Religion and Politics in the 1988 Election (Westview Press) (ISBN 0813381835)
- (1993) Machine politics, Sound Bites, and Nostalgia: On Studying Political Parties (University Press of America) (ISBN 0819188557)
- (1994) Politics, Professionalism, and Power: Modern Party Organization and the Legacy of Ray C. Bliss (University Press of America) (ISBN 0819193518)
- (1994) Representing Interests and Interest Group Representation (University Press of America) (ISBN 0819194581)
- (1996) Religion and the Culture Wars: Dispatches From the Front (Rowman & Littlefield) (ISBN 0847682676)
- (1997) The Bully Pulpit: The Politics of Protestant Clergy (University Press of Kansas) (ISBN 0700608680)
- (1999) Financing the 1996 Elections (M.E. Sharpe) (ISBN 0765603845)
- (2000) Prayers in the Precincts: the Christian Right in the 1998 Elections (Georgetown University Press) (ISBN 087840774X)
- (2001) The Politics of Ideas: Intellectual Challenges to the Major Parties (State University of New York Press) (ISBN 0791450449)
- (2001) Superintending Democracy: The Courts and the Political Process (University of Akron Press) (ISBN 1884836720)
- (2002) Responsible Partisanship?: The Evolution of American Political Parties Since 1950 (University Press of Kansas) (ISBN 0700612165)
- (2002) Multiparty Politics in America: Prospects and Performance (Rowman & Littlefield) (ISBN 0742515982)
- (2003) The Christian Right in American Politics: Marching to the Millennium (Georgetown University Press) (ISBN 0878403922)
- (2003) The State of the Parties: The Changing Role of Contemporary Party Politics (Rowman & Littlefield) (ISBN 0742518213)
- (2003) The Test of Time: Coping with Legislative Term Limits (Lexington Books) (ISBN 0739104446)
- (2005) The Final Arbiter: The Consequences of Bush v. Gore for Law and Politics (State University of New York Press) (ISBN 0791465357)
- (2006) The Values Campaign?: The Christian Right and the 2004 Elections (Georgetown University Press) (ISBN 1589011090)
- (2007) Fountain of Youth: Strategies and Tactics for Mobilizing America's Young Voters (Rowman & Littlefield) (ISBN 0742539652)
- (2010) The Faith Factor: How Religion Influences American Elections (Potomac Books Inc.) at Amazon. ISBN 978-1597974301

=== Publications ===
- (2004) American Religious Landscape and Political Attitudes: A Baseline for 2004
