= Lawrence Solum =

American legal theorist

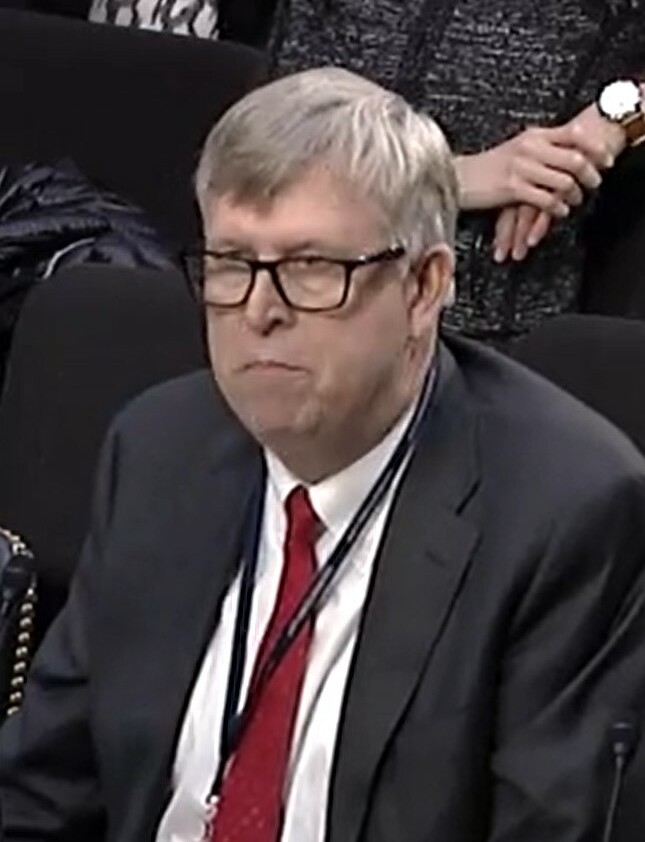
- Solum in 2017
- Born: Lawrence Byard Solum; 1954 (age 71–72)
- Occupation: Law professor

Academic background
- Education: University of California, Los Angeles (BA); Harvard University (JD)

Academic work
- Discipline: Law
- Institutions: Georgetown University Law Center; University of Virginia School of Law; Texas A&M University
- Main interests: Philosophy of law; Constitutional theory

Lawrence Byard Solum (born 1954) is an American legal theorist known for his work in the philosophy of law and constitutional theory. He is currently a Professor of Law at Texas A&M University Law School where he serves as co-director of the Center of the Structural Constitution. Solum previously served as the William L. Matheson and Robert M. Morgenthau Distinguished Professor of Law and the Douglas D. Drysdale Research Professor of Law at the University of Virginia School of Law, where he had taught since 2020.

Solum edits and publishes the "Legal Theory Blog", a website dedicated to highlighting new works of legal scholarship and featuring a recurring series called the "Legal Theory Lexicon", which explains key concepts and terminology in legal theory.

== Education ==
Solum received a B.A. in philosophy from the University of California, Los Angeles, with highest departmental honors. He then received a J.D., magna cum laude, from Harvard Law School, where he became an editor of the Harvard Law Review.

== Career ==
After law school, Solum was a law clerk to Judge William A. Norris of the United States Court of Appeals for the Ninth Circuit from 1984 to 1985. Prior to academia, he also worked at the law firm of Cravath, Swaine, and Moore in New York City. He was previously the Carmack Waterhouse Professor of Law at the Georgetown University Law Center. Solum has also served as a professor of law at the University of Illinois College of Law, the University of San Diego School of Law, and Loyola Law School.

== Publications ==
=== Books ===
- Bennett, Robert W.; Solum, Lawrence B. (2011). Constitutional Originalism: A Debate. Ithaca, NY: Cornell University Press. ISBN 9780801461118.

=== Selected Articles ===
- — (1987). "On the Indeterminacy Crisis: Critiquing Critical Dogma". University of Chicago Law Review. 54 (2): 462—503. JSTOR 1599797.
- — (2004). "Procedural Justice". Southern California Law Review. 78 (1): 181—322.
- — (2010). "The Interpretation-Construction Distinction". Constitutional Commentary. 27 (1): 95—118.
- — (2013). "Originalism and Constitutional Construction". Fordham Law Review. 82 (2): 453—538.
- — (2015). "The Fixation Thesis: The Role of Historical Fact in Original Meaning". Notre Dame Law Review. 91 (1): 1—78.
