= Russell Muirhead =

American politician

Member of the New Hampshire House of Representatives from the Grafton 12th district
- Incumbent
- Assumed office December 2, 2020

Personal details
- Born: James Russell Muirhead Jr. December 28, 1965 (age 60)
- Party: Democratic
- Spouse: Toni Barry
- Children: 2

Academic background
- Education: Harvard University (AB, PhD); Balliol College, Oxford (BA)

Academic work
- Discipline: Government; Politics
- Sub-discipline: American politics Conspiracy theories
- Institutions: Williams College; Harvard University; University of Texas at Austin; Dartmouth College

James Russell Muirhead Jr. (born December 28, 1965) is an American academic, politician, and author serving as a member of the New Hampshire House of Representatives for the Grafton 12th district. He assumed office on December 2, 2020. He is also the Robert Clements Professor of Democracy and Politics and the Chair of the Department of Government at Dartmouth College.

== Early life and education ==
A native of Manchester, New Hampshire, Muirhead graduated from Manchester Central High School and earned a Bachelor of Arts in government from Harvard College. The recipient of a Rhodes Scholarship in 1987, Muirhead earned a Bachelor of Arts in philosophy, politics and economics from Balliol College, Oxford. He later received a Doctor of Philosophy in government from Harvard University.

== Career ==
From 1996 to 1998, Muirhead was an assistant professor of political science at Williams College. From 1998 to 2006, he was an assistant and associate professor of government at Harvard University. From 2006 to 2009, he was an associate professor of government at the University of Texas at Austin. He has been the Robert Clements Professor of Democracy and Politics at Dartmouth College since 2009. Muirhead is a frequent seminar moderator for the Aspen Institute. Muirhead's research focuses on American political thought, democratic theory, political parties in the United States, and the rise of conspiracy theories in United States politics. Muirhead has written books on partisanship and the moral meaning of work in American political thought. In 2019, he co-authored A Lot of People Are Saying: The New Conspiracism and the Assault on Democracy with Nancy L. Rosenblum. In 2024, Muirhead and Rosenblum published Ungoverning: The Attack on the Administrative State and the Politics of Chaos. Muirhead was first elected to the New Hampshire House of Representatives in November 2020. He is a member of the House Election Law Committee, where he has been the prime sponsor of bills on campaign finance reform, public financing of campaigns, and the single ballot primary.
