= The Demands of Liberal Education =

Book by Meria Levinson

- Author: Meira Levinson
- Language: English
- Subjects: Citizenship, liberalism, autonomy (psychology)
- Publisher: Oxford University Press
- Publication date: 1999
- Publication place: United States
- Pages: 250
- ISBN: 978-0-19-829544-0
- Dewey Decimal: 370.11
- LC Class: LC1091.L38

The Demands of Liberal Education is a 1999 political philosophy book by Meira Levinson that establishes a liberal political theory of children's education that fits the mutual needs of the state and its diverse citizenry. She writes that the intent of a liberal education—an education that follows from a liberal society's values—is to maximize the autonomy of individual children through increasing their capacity for liberty. Levinson argues autonomy as a right to children. The book, published by Oxford University Press, aims to address a lacuna between educational policy and liberal political theory.

Levinson advocates for a weak perfectionist state that can promote thick autonomy while accepting citizens who do not agree. She argues for public schools "common" to all citizens and "detached" from individual citizen or community values, and argues for a constitutional mandate to this end.

Reviewers recommended the book for public educators as an important contribution to liberal theory. Their common criticism was based around practical applications and the imposition of autonomy as a value, e.g., her contemporary examples of national civics education, how citizens who disagreed with the focus on autonomy could be accommodated, and how a weak perfectionist state could defend marginalized group interests in a public school setting.

== Overview ==
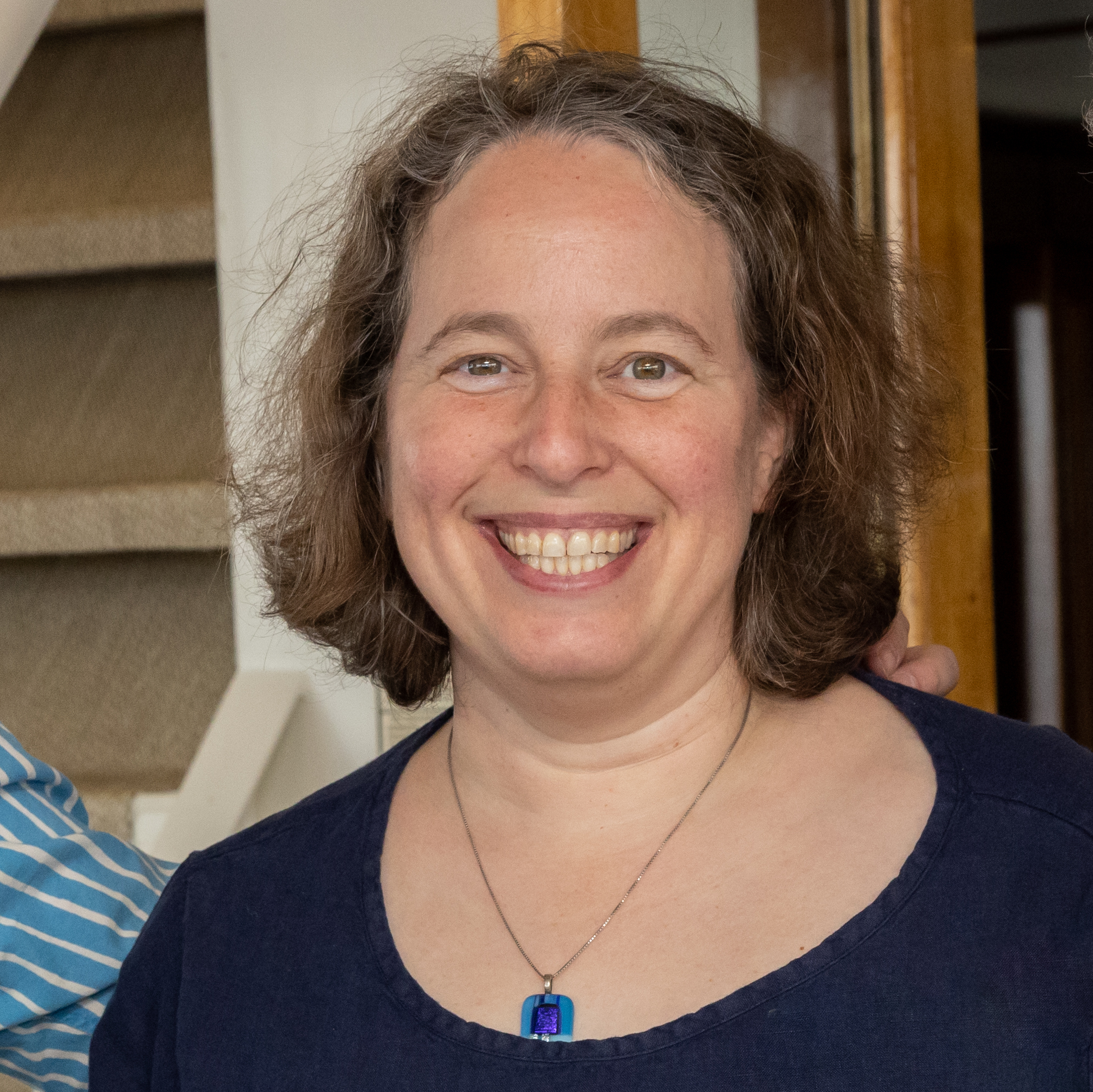
Meira Levinson in 2023

In The Demands of Liberal Education, Meira Levinson sets out to write a "coherent liberal political theory of children's education" that establishes how education can mutually satisfy the conflicting interests of the state and its diverse citizenry. "Liberal education" is defined as the type of education that follows from a liberal society's values. (Note: This definition is different from a traditional definition, where "liberal education" denoted a self-contained approach to education that disregarded external societal conditions.) Levinson writes that the intent of liberal education is to maximize individual autonomy in successive generations, particularly by "cultivating the 'capacity' to exercise liberty". Autonomy and its cultivation is the primary moral aim of liberal education. Levinson argues from a liberal political philosophy rather than from a philosophy of education, and contends that a broad liberal education best equips for individual autonomy and thus creates the best republic.

Meira Levinson published The Demands of Liberal Education in 1999 with Oxford University Press. She was a secondary schoolteacher at the time, having completed her D. Phil at the University of Oxford in 1997. Her thesis is titled "Autonomy, Schooling, and the Reconstruction of the Liberal Educational Ideal". The book was published in paperback in April 2002. The work aimed to address a lack of literature between educational policy and liberal political theory, with the intent to serve both constituencies.

== Summary ==
The aim of liberal education is to teach children the skills, habits, knowledge, and dispositions for them to be thoughtful, mature, self-assured individuals who map their path in the world with care and confidence, take responsibility for their actions, fulfill their duties as citizens, question themselves and others when appropriate, listen to and learn from others, and ultimately lead their lives with dignity, integrity, and self-respect—i.e. to be autonomous in the fullest sense of the word ...

— The Demands of Liberal Education, p. 164

The first chapter assumes the importance of liberalism. Levinson writes about the foundations of liberalism and asserts that the political liberalism of John Rawls is untenable for its lack of interest in values of autonomy. She concludes that liberal states must adopt a "weakly perfectionist stance towards autonomy", or a stance that promotes thick autonomy while accepting citizens who do not share that value. Levinson acknowledges the influence of non-formal education but focuses on public schools as the ideal institution for training citizens. She advocates for public schools that are "common" to all members of a community and "detached" from the internal values of the community (or parents).

Levinson proposes that citizenship education can provide the "cultural coherence" that may be missing from a "detached" school—which would be a diverse community that prioritizes "critical thinking, tolerance, and reflectiveness". She argues for a constitutional mandate to establish the "autonomy-promoting aim of education" regardless of public support, and asks for a "culture change". Levinson distinguishes between parental and child rights, as laws exist for parents who do not act in their children's best interests. She adds that children are limited by the restricted scope of their parents' knowledge, and that the state should intervene to combat this small-mindedness in the interests of children. Specifically, she cites Christian criticism of curricular neutrality as a tactic to justify the imposition of their own "limited and restrictive" worldview, and that external knowledge increases the odds of their children not adopting their worldview. Her argument is that the limited worldviews resulting from "excessive paternalism" consequently stunt children's ability to develop adult autonomy or make rational decisions. Thus, state and parental paternalism should be limited where it will hurt individual "capacity for autonomy".

Towards her "weak perfectionist" liberalism, Levinson requires three traits of a liberal society: (1) an agreeable, transparent, and equally accessible "legitimation process" for government, (2) pluralism, and (3) "substantive liberal institutions" such as "individual liberties and ... governmental duties". She pairs this view of liberalism with thick autonomy as "the only defensible interpretation of liberalism". Levinson develops an idea of autonomy that would be agreeable to most citizens while sufficient to guarantee liberalism's "substantive liberal institutions", and defines it as "higher-order preference formation" that minds one's personal values while allowing for openness to criticism and a developed personality. She argues that capacity for autonomy is a right to children, that the state is obligated to facilitate it, and that children are obligated to receive it. In this way, Levinson's stance is that the state must make education compulsory. Children require paternalistic decisions of some sort, and the state is best suited to promote consent and operate in the best interests of children. The state has a right to override lack of child and parental interest in such an autonomy-promoting education, since such an override lets children decide their values later in life, as adults, as opposed to never having that opportunity. Levinson contends that parents, on the other hand, must provide for the well-being, identity development, and "cultural coherence" sense of their children.

Another chapter compares how the American, English, and French educational systems foster private and public identities. She writes that the English system accommodates too strongly to private interests, as parents and special interest groups can establish separate communities where the government "partially funds (‘maintains’) schools that cater to these private interests," but French public schools defect too strongly to public interests even at the expense of religious freedom for minority students, specifically muslim girls who wear hijab. She additionally claims that American schools fall somewhere in the middle of these two extremes. On the one hand, American education "embraces pluralism as a truly desirable, public good that should be fostered and appreciated at both the national and personal level," or ensures that diversity is celebrated; however, the system also places a students public and private identity "uneasily inside each other like Russian matrioshka dolls."

Levinson then advocates for "controlled choice" in American education, which implies the following: no default options for schooling; selection support from education counselors for families; selection decisions should be made after an application deadline to prevent "first come, first serve"; schools do not have admissions criteria; and schools provide free transportation to allow students to attend any school within a specific area. Such measures will ensure that all families have access to good choices that are freely available to them. At the same time, Levinson argues that religious schools might not work in a liberal choice system because they hold "fundamental" conceptions of "the good" and are "divisive," both of which might lead parents to not feel comfortable enrolling their children in these schools. She ultimately argues that a liberal system of education can only be formulated by liberal principals, so liberal education requires considerations for autonomy and should be oriented towards its development.

== Reception ==
In his Philosophical Books review, Graham Haydon wrote that the book was part of a trend of political philosopher interest in how education works within liberal-democratic societies. He noted issues of compatibility between a society's self-described "liberal" values and the values of their educational practice, or between a society's educational practice and the wishes of its citizens. Haydon wrote critics of the common and detached public school would ask how the students would be raised without "some cultural coherence". Writing in 2001, he said that her criticism of England's civics education already appeared outdated in view of England's then-new National Curriculum citizenship curriculum, which he felt Levinson would find the "best model ... consistent with her own argument". He added that the "radical pluralist" societies used as examples do not accommodate citizens that hold other values over "autonomy", and do not answer how citizens can be convinced to believe in "autonomy-promoting" schools. Haydon considered her book "an important contribution" to liberal theory and wrote that "it would be a loss to political philosophy" if she continued her work as a schoolteacher in lieu of an academic career.

Kern Alexander of the Journal of Education Finance compared Levinson's view of parental and child rights to Michael Walzer's 1984 Spheres of Justice, where he writes that children confined to parental teachings alone when without compulsory public schools. Alexander linked Walzer and Levinson's views on parental school choice as more about "choosing 'schoolmates than schoolbooks'", to the detriment of "cultural cohesion" and for reasons unrelated to educational quality. Alexander recommended the book for "all public educators" for its thoughts on the role of school privatization, homeschooling, and voucher programs.

Writing for Studies in Philosophy and Education, Doret de Ruyter approved of Levinson's emphasis on autonomy and concurred that Levinson's definition of autonomy would be agreeable to citizens of Western liberal countries. De Ruyter was unsure about edge cases of autonomy, such as whether being closed-minded to the prospect of a pierced belly button would make her a less autonomous person in Levinson's view. She also disagreed with Levinson's position of parental "privilege" (rather than right) over their children, and invoked Wesley Newcomb Hohfeld to argue that parents instead have the opposite of a privilege, a "duty", to their children's interests and require the liberty to fulfill it, including through education. To defend this parental duty to children and freedom from society in fulfillment of the duty, de Ruyter cited John Eekelaar's parental duty-right to educate children: a positive right to educate as they see fit and a negative right that prevents others from impeding. She concluded that the state's duty conflicts with the duty of parents and thus the state's duty is "primarily ... against children".

De Ruyter also disagreed that "detached" schools were the only means of inculcating capacity for autonomy, (Note: De Ruyter quotes Levinson conceding that it is "hardly tenable" to consider schools the most influential educational source of children, and that home life constitutes a greater influence.) and argued for "autonomy enhancing education" over "autonomy imposing education". In her criticism, de Ruyter wrote that Levinson lacked critical distance from her idea of a "detached" school, which were presented in "utopian character", with no concrete examples of such a school in existence, and as inexplicably immune from "capitalist-dominated education". She added that "detachment" was vague in definition, that more important was detachment from absolutist or divisive stances of "the good life", and that curriculum and school management were better correlative factors towards liberal schools. De Ruyter concluded that "autonomy imposing schools" would be more harmful than respectful and "autonomy-friendly ... reduced plural environments", as a child would be better off in an imperfect pluralist than a homogenous fundamentalist classroom. Levinson responded to de Ruyter's points in a later issue of the journal.

In Educational Researcher, Luis Mirón and Pradeep Dhillon wrote that theorists of education and liberal political philosophy could not "afford to ignore" the book. They wrote that the state would have to be "benign" and "hermetically sealed" from external influence for her theory to hold—that such a state would be weak against the interests of illiberal parties. They added that her evaluation of public education across several countries did not account for supranational influence and that she did not engage the potential issues endemic to integrating heteronymous illiberals. Additionally, they felt that the book lacked in its practical proposals for public school civics education, particularly in how a weak perfectionist, "activist" state can intervene on behalf of marginalized group interests in a public school setting.

The book was discussed in a group session at the American Philosophical Association's 2002 annual meeting. The panel, led by James Dwyer, included William Galston, Fran Schrag, Yuli Tamir, and a response from the author.
