= Nancy L. Rosenblum =

American political philosopher

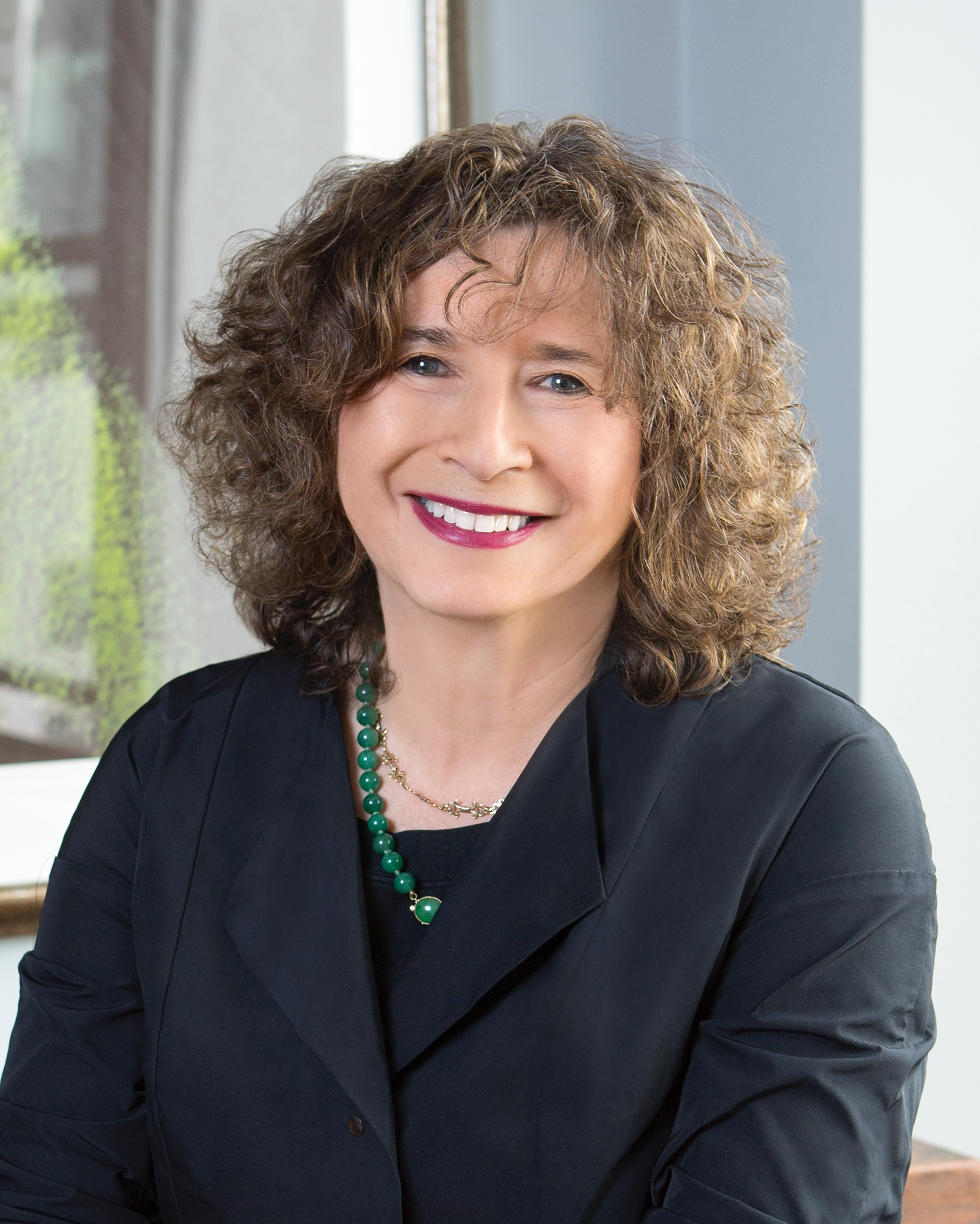
- Born: November 10, 1947 (age 78); Teaneck, New Jersey, U.S.
- Spouse: Richard Rosenblum (died 2000)
- Children: 1
- Awards: Doctor of Humane Letters, Kalamazoo College (1993); David Easton Award (2002)

Academic background
- Education: Radcliffe College (BA); Harvard University (PhD)
- Thesis: Jeremy Bentham and the Modern State (1972)

Academic work
- Institutions: Harvard University; Brown University

Nancy Lipton Rosenblum (born November 10, 1947) is an American political scientist and political philosopher. She is the Senator Joseph S. Clark Professor of Ethics in Politics and Government at Harvard University and has been the co-editor of the Annual Review of Political Science (2015 to 2023). She studies modern political thought and constitutional law. Rosenblum has been the Chair of both the government department at Harvard and the political science department at Brown University, and a member of the leadership of several professional organizations in political science and political philosophy.

== Early life and education ==
Rosenblum was born on November 10, 1947. She was the oldest of seven children born to an economist father and social worker mother who divorced. Most of her youth was spent in Teaneck, New Jersey. Rosenblum earned a Bachelor of Arts from Radcliffe College and a Doctor of Philosophy in political science from Harvard University.

== Career ==
Upon earning her PhD, Rosenblum accepted the Henry LaBarre Jayne Assistant Professor position at Harvard University's Department of Government from 1973 until 1977. She was promoted to associate professor in 1977 and in 1980 she moved to Brown University. During this time, she published her first book titled Bentham's Theory of the Modern State, in which she synthesizes a variety of arguments by Jeremy Bentham to argue that one of his major accomplishments was an innovative theory of the modern state, together with a theory of how politics should be modernized.

Upon joining the political science department at Brown in 1980, Rosenblum became their first female faculty member in history. During her time at Brown, she was the chairperson of the political science department and the Henry Merritt Wriston Professor. In 1987, she published Another Liberalism: Romanticism and the Reconstruction of Liberal Thought through the Harvard University Press. In the book, Rosenblum describes the dynamic of romanticism and liberalism as one of mutual opposition and reconciliation. In 1993, Rosenblum was awarded a Doctor of Humane Letters by Kalamazoo College. Following the publication of Another Liberalism, she authored another book in 1998 titled Membership and Morals: The Personal Uses of Pluralism in America, which received the David Easton Prize in 2002 by the Foundations of Political Theory. In Membership and Morals, Rosenblum uses historical research and legal analysis to argue that courts have interpreted individuals' belonging to political organizations mainly in terms of how their participation advances the organization's formal political goals, whereas it is necessary to also consider how affiliation with an association can serve an expressive purpose. Rosenblum was also an editor of Liberalism and the Moral Life (1993), Thoreau: Political Writings, Cambridge Texts in the History of Political Thought (1996), and Obligations of Citizenship and Demands of Faith: Religious Accommodation in Pluralist Democracies (2000).

During her time at Brown, Rosenblum periodically visited Harvard, and she moved back full time in 2001. Shortly after returning to Harvard, Rosenblum was appointed the Senator Joseph Clark Professor of Ethics in Politics and Government professor and honored as a fellow of the American Academy of Arts and Sciences. She also edited Civil Society and Government with Robert Post and Breaking the Cycles of Hatred: Memory, Law, and Repair, and was appointed chair of the department of government. She was the department chair from 2004 to 2010. In 2010, Rosenblum published On the Side of the Angels: An Appreciation of Parties and Partisanship, in which she argues against criticisms of partisan politics as being polarizing, destructive, and un-democratic, arguing instead that partisanship is essentially a productive force that creates political interests and opinions while also being congruent with the core virtues of democracy.

Rosenblum was named the recipient of a Walter Channing Cabot Fellowship for "distinguished accomplishments in the fields of literature, history, or art, broadly conceived", awarded for On the Side of the Angels, and was elected the vice-president of the American Political Science Association. She has also been the president of the American Society for Political and Legal Philosophy, and a member of the board of the Russell Sage Foundation.

In 2016, Rosenblum published the book Good Neighbors: The Democracy of Everyday Life in America. In Good Neighbors, Rosenblum argues that neighborliness is a type of everyday democracy that is practiced well in the real world but has received minimal scholarly attention, in contrast to "citizenship", which has received a great deal of theorizing but is practiced poorly in the real world. In Good Neighbors, Rosenblum complements the rich history of theories about citizenship by developing a moral and political theory about what makes a good neighbor.

In A Lot of People Are Saying: The New Conspiracism and the Assault on Democracy (2020) Rosenblum and Russell Muirhead examine the history and psychology of conspiracy theories and the ways in which they are used to de-legitimize the political system. They distinguish between classical conspiracy theory in which actual events and issues are examined and combined to create a theory, and a new form of "conspiracism without theory" that relies on the repetition of false statements and hearsay without invoking a basis of factual grounding.

== Personal life ==
Rosenblum and her husband Richard had one daughter together, Anna Rosenblum Palmer. After Richard's death in 2000, Rosenblum donated his sculpture Adam to the New Orleans Museum of Art.

== Works ==
- Rosenblum, Nancy L. (5 February 1975). Bentham's Theory of the Modern State. Harvard University Press. ISBN 978-0674432246.
- Rosenblum, Nancy L.; Muirhead, Russell (18 February 2020) [2019]. A Lot of People Are Saying: The New Conspiracism and the Assault on Democracy. Princeton University Press. ISBN 978-0-691-20475-8. OCLC 1131722522.

== See also ==
- Harvard University
