= Quin Monson =

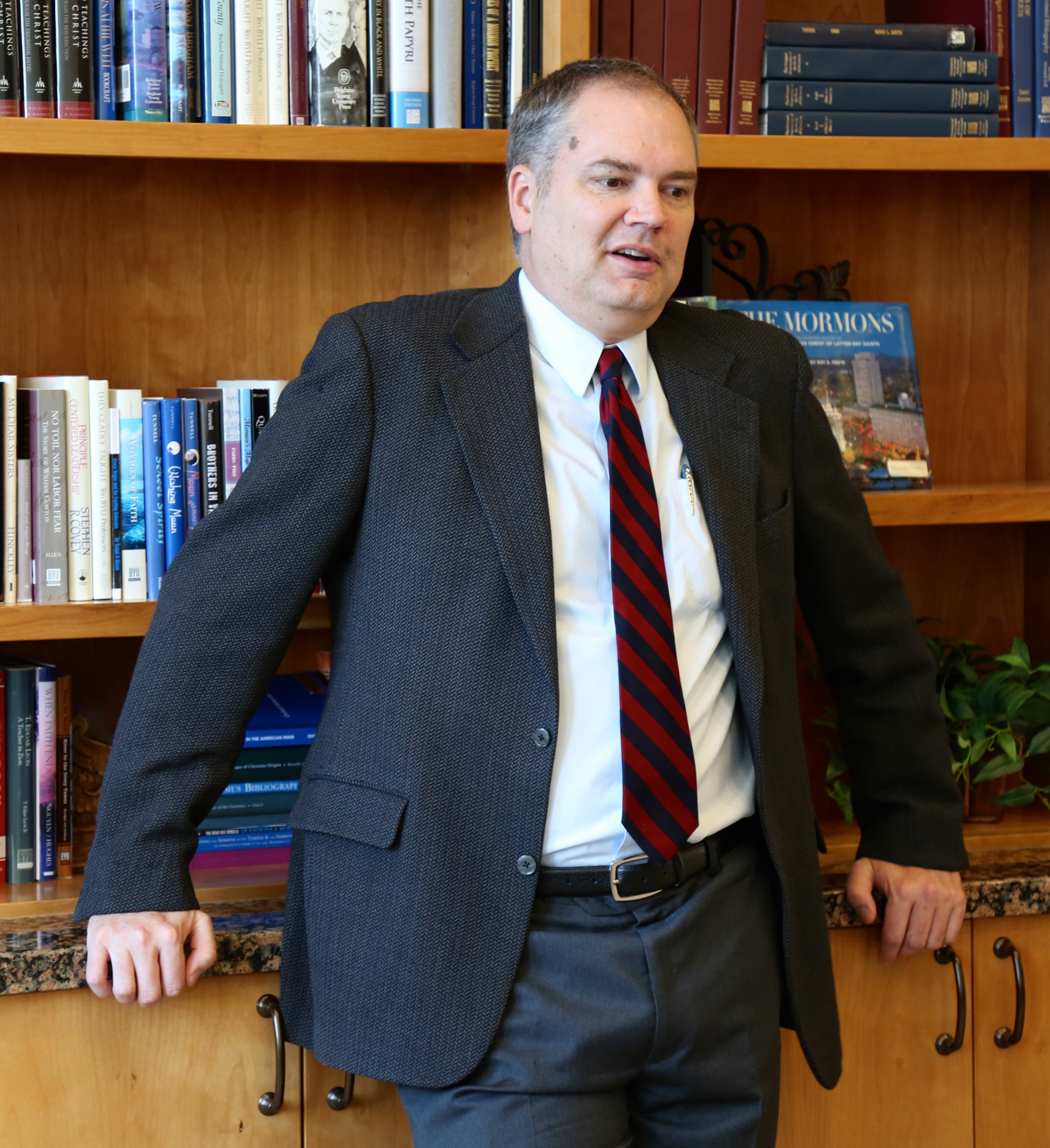
Quin Monson in 2016

J. Quin Monson (born 1969) is an American political scientist and professor of political science at Brigham Young University. He is also a senior scholar at the university's Center for the Study of Elections and Democracy.

Monson holds a Ph.D. from Ohio State University.

Monson is a co-author of Seeking the Promised Land: Mormons and American Politics with David E. Campbell and John C. Green.
