= Paul E. Peterson =

Paul E. Peterson is an American scholar on education reform. His work has largely focused on the importance of parental choice for improving school outcomes. He is Editor-In-Chief of Education Next, an educational policy journal published by the Hoover Institution advocating for K-12 education reform in the United States. He is the Henry Lee Shattuck Professor of Government and Director of the Program on Education Policy and Governance at Harvard University and a senior fellow at Stanford University's Hoover Institution.

Peterson is the author or editor of over one hundred articles and thirty-plus books including: School Money Trials: The Legal Pursuit of Educational Adequacy (Brookings, 2007); The Education Gap: Vouchers and Urban Schools, Revised Edition (Brookings, 2006); and Our Schools and our Future...Are We Still At Risk? (Hoover Institution Press, 2003). Three other of his books (School Politics, Chicago Style; City Limits; and The Price of Federalism) received major awards from the American Political Science Association.

He received his PhD from the University of Chicago and is a member of the American Academy of Arts and Sciences and the National Academy of Education. The Editorial Projects in Education Research Center reported that Peterson's studies on school choice and vouchers were among the country's most influential studies of education policy.
