= Charnay =

Charnay may refer to:

- Désiré Charnay (1828-1915), a French traveller and archaeologist

Charnay is the name or part of the name of several communes in France:

- Charnay, in the Doubs département
- Charnay, in the Rhône département
- Charnay-lès-Chalon, in the Saône-et-Loire département
- Charnay-lès-Mâcon, in the Saône-et-Loire département
