= Arthur Applbaum =

Arthur Applbaum is an American researcher into ethical issues in public life. He is the Adams Professor of Political Leadership and Democratic Values at Harvard University and has written widely in the areas of ethics, political legitimacy, civil disobedience, and morality. He holds degrees from Princeton University (AB) and Harvard Kennedy School (MPP, Ph.D.).

== Selected publications ==
- Applbaum A. (1999). Ethics for Adversaries. Princeton, NJ: Princeton Univ. Press
- Applbaum, A. I. (2019). Legitimacy: The right to rule in a wanton world. Harvard University Press.
- Applbaum, Arthur (2004). Legitimacy in a Bastard Kingdom. Center for Public Leadership Working Paper Series (2004)
