= Dennis F. Thompson =

American political scientist

- Born: May 12, 1940; Hamilton, Ohio
- Died: 30 March 2025 (aged 84); Peterborough, New Hampshire
- Education: College of William & Mary; Oxford University; Harvard University
- Occupations: Political Scientist; Professor
- Employer: Harvard University

Dennis Frank Thompson (12 May 1940 - 30 March 2025) was a political scientist and professor at Harvard University, where he founded the university-wide Center for Ethics and the Professions (now the Edmond & Lily Safra Center for Ethics). Thompson was known for his pioneering work in the fields of both political ethics and democratic theory. According to a recent appraisal, he became “influential within the world of political theory" by offering “greater concrete political thought than Rawls” and by showing “an atypical grasp, for a political theorist, of the real political world.”

Thompson was a leading proponent of the institutional approach to political ethics, which gives less attention to individual vices (such as greed and sexual misconduct) and more to institutional ones (such as abuse of power and neglect of accountability). His approach stimulated new work on institutional corruption. Thompson's proposal to establish an independent body to regulate congressional ethics has been widely endorsed, though not by many members of the United States Congress. However, in March 2008, the U.S. House created a pared down version of such a body--the Office of Congressional Ethics.

Thompson's first book on democratic theory, The Democratic Citizen: Social Science and Democratic Theory in the 20th Century, published in 1970, was one of the first to relate contemporary social science to theories of democracy. His much-cited 1996 book, Democracy and Disagreement, co-authored with Amy Gutmann, has been influential in promoting the idea of deliberative democracy, which calls for more reasoned discourse in public life. It is still stimulating discussion and controversy, and has led to the publication of an entire book devoted to its criticism and defense (Deliberative Politics, edited by Stephen Macedo). Some critics object that deliberative democracy is biased in favor of political elites. Defenders argue that more and better political deliberation can help all citizens. Thompson has worked to apply the ideas of deliberative democracy to such institutions as the U.S. electoral process, the South African Truth and Reconciliation Commission, the British Columbia Citizens’ Assembly on Electoral Reform, and healthcare organizations in the United Kingdom.

About his most recent book, The Spirit of Compromise: Why Governing Demands It and Campaigning Undermines It (also co-authored with Amy Gutmann), Judy Woodruff of the PBS NewsHour commented: "a clear-eyed examination of the forces that bring warring political leaders together or keep them apart. I wish every policymaker would read it."

== Biography ==
Thompson graduated summa cum laude from the College of William and Mary in 1962 and won a Fulbright Fellowship to Oxford University, where he took a “first” in Philosophy, Politics, and Economics. He went on to earn a Ph.D. in political science from Harvard in 1968. He taught for 18 years at Princeton University before returning to Harvard as the Alfred North Whitehead Professor in 1986.

With the support of then President Derek Bok, Thompson created the university-wide Ethics Center to encourage more and better teaching and research in ethical issues in the professions and public life. Its mission and influence broadened over the years. More than 800 Fellows—faculty, practitioners, and students selected from universities throughout the nation and several foreign countries—have completed a year at the Center. Many went on to establish similar programs at other universities (including the University Center for Human Values at Princeton, the Centre for Ethics at the University of Toronto, and the Kenan Institute for Ethics at Duke), and assume important roles in government and public life (including the United Nations and the Israeli cabinet).

A conflict of interest is a set of conditions in which professional judgment concerning a primary interest (such as a patient's welfare or the validity of research) tends to be unduly influenced by a secondary interest (such as financial gain). Conflict-of-interest rules [...] regulate the disclosure and avoidance of these conditions.

— Dennis F. Thompson, The New England Journal of Medicine, 1993

Thompson served as a consultant to the Joint Ethics Committee of the South African Parliament, the American Medical Association, the U.S. Senate Select Committee on Ethics, the Office of Personnel Management, and the Department of Health and Human Services. In 1990-91, he worked closely with Robert S. Bennett, then the Special Counsel for the Senate Ethics Committee in the investigation of the so-called “Keating Five.” In 1990 he helped found the Association for Practical and Professional Ethics, from which he received a lifetime achievement award in 2010. In 1994 he was elected to membership in the American Academy of Arts and Sciences. Starting in 1994, Thompson served for ten years as a member of the Board of Trustees of Smith College, the last five as vice-chair. He was a founding member of the editorial boards of Philosophy and Public Affairs and Political Theory. He was a member of the Institute of Medicine's national committee that published the influential report on "Conflict of Interest in Medical Research, Education, and Practice" in 2009.

At Harvard, Thompson served as Associate Provost (1996–2001) and as the Senior Adviser to the then President Lawrence Summers (2001–04). He also twice acted as Provost (1998, 2001–02). In these roles, he chaired groups that formulated the original plans for the development of the new campus in Allston, created a new policy on intellectual property to deal with digital works, wrote the first policy to regulate the university's relationships with outside commercial enterprises, and revised rules that govern the outside activities of faculty members, including their participation in online educational ventures. He also played a key role in the negotiations that led to the creation of the Radcliffe Institute for Advanced Study in 2000.

In 2007, Thompson stepped down as director of the Edmond J. Safra Center for Ethics. He left the Center with one of the largest endowments of any center at Harvard. His successor was Lawrence Lessig, a prominent law professor who had been a Fellow at the Center ten years earlier. In 2015 Danielle Allen, a distinguished scholar at the Institute for Advanced Study in Princeton, replaced Lessig. In July 2023, Eric Beerbohm succeeded Allen as the center's fourth director. In 2013, Thompson retired from Harvard, but continued his work and association with the Center as an emeritus professor. Thompson died on March 30, 2025, in Peterborough, New Hampshire.

== Published books ==
- The Democratic Citizen: Social Science and Democratic Theory in the 20th Century (1970)
- John Stuart Mill and Representative Government (1976)
- Political Ethics and Public Office (1987)
- Ethics in Congress: From Individual to Institutional Corruption (1995)
- Democracy and Disagreement [with Amy Gutmann] (1996)
- Redeeming American Political Thought: Collected Essays of Judith Shklar [with Stanley Hoffman] (1997)
- Truth versus Justice: The Morality of Truth Commissions [with Robert Rotberg] (2000)
- Just Elections: Creating a Fair Electoral Process in the U.S. (2002)
- Why Deliberative Democracy? [with Amy Gutmann] (2004)
- Restoring Responsibility: Ethics in Government, Business and Healthcare (2004)
- Ethics and Politics: Cases and Comments [with Amy Gutmann] (fourth edition, 2005).
- The Spirit of Compromise: Why Governing Demands It and Campaigning Undermines It [with Amy Gutmann] (2012; paperback edition with new preface, 2014)
