= Institutional corruption =

Phenomenon of placing protection of reputation above fidelity to truth in public bodies

Institutional corruption is the phenomenon in public bodies of placing the protection of reputation above fidelity to the truth, especially in the context of an independent or public inquiry.

Institutional corruption is differentiated from corruption by the institution's willingness to frustrate or slow the work of independent formal inquiries, even after official reports and documentation recognise that such an inquiry is necessary.

Institutional corruption is not limited to national-scale institutions. It can be as small as a single recommendation of a report rejected because an institution wishes not to admit meaningful change, or the misreporting of statistics in the Stafford Hospital scandal.

== Examples ==
=== United Kingdom ===
- Independent Inquiry into the Murder of Daniel Morgan—2021 report, criticizing the Metropolitan Police.
- Windrush scandal—2020 report, criticizing the Home Office
- Hillsborough disaster—reports in 2012, 2016 and 2017, criticizing South Yorkshire and West Midlands police forces
- Stafford Hospital scandal—2013 report, criticizing Mid Staffordshire NHS Foundation Trust

=== Ireland ===
- Mother and Baby Homes Commission of Investigation—2021 report, criticizing Catholic mother-and-baby homes and the Irish State

=== Canada ===
- Truth and Reconciliation Commission of Canada—2015 report, criticizing the Canadian Indian residential school system, the Canadian federal government, and the Royal Canadian Mounted Police
