= Frederick M. Hess =

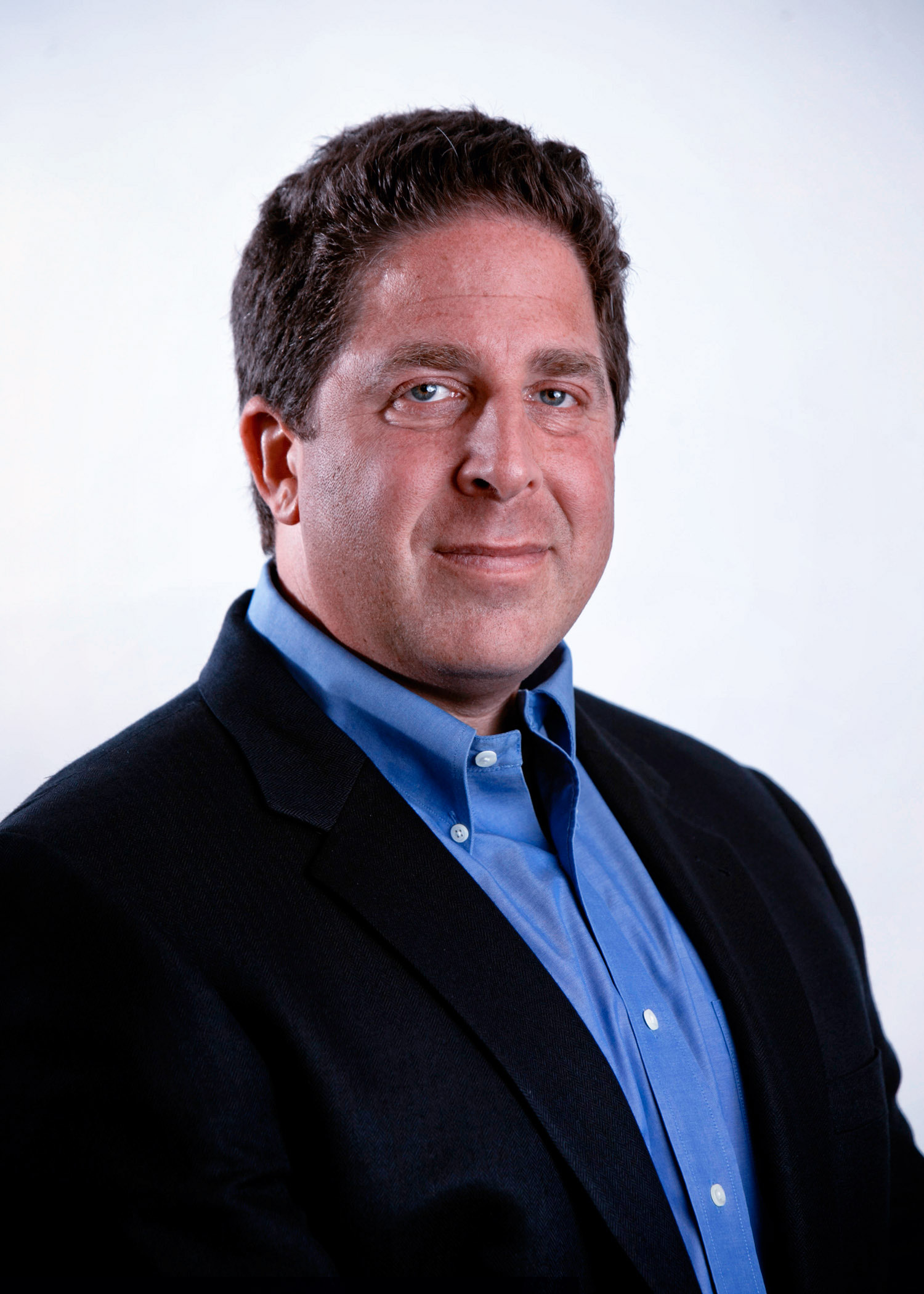
- Frederick M. Hess in 2017
- Born: January 28, 1968 (age 58)
- Occupation: Director of Education Policy Studies at the American Enterprise Institute

Academic background
- Education: Brandeis University (BA); Harvard University (MEd, MA, PhD)

Academic work
- Institutions: American Enterprise Institute
- Notable works: The Great School Rethink (2023) A Search for Common Ground (2021) The Same Thing Over and Over (2010) Letters to a Young Education Reformer (2017) Cage-Busting Leadership (2013) Spinning Wheels: The Politics of Urban School Reform (1998)
- Website: http://www.aei.org/scholar/frederick-m-hess/

Frederick M. Hess is an American educator, political scientist, and author. He is a resident fellow and director of education policy studies at the American Enterprise Institute, and the author of the blogs "Rick Hess Straight Up" at Education Week and "Old School with Rick Hess" at Education Next. He is an executive editor of Education Next and a contributing editor to National Review. His books include Spinning Wheels, Letters to a Young Education Reformer, Cage-Busting Leadership, A Search for Common Ground, The Great School Rethink, and Getting Education Right.

Hess's research focuses on K-12 and higher education issues.

== Education and early career ==
Hess studied political science at Brandeis University, graduating summa cum laude. Upon graduating, he enrolled at Harvard Graduate School of Education, where he earned his M.Ed. in teaching and curriculum. He began his education career as a high school social studies teacher in Baton Rouge, Louisiana. After gaining first-hand experience in the classroom, he returned to Harvard for an M.A. and Ph.D. in government. His dissertation examined education reform in 57 school districts and the "spinning wheels" of rapid short-term improvement in urban schools. It eventually became the first of his many books, published in 1998 by the Brookings Institution Press.

Hess joined the faculty at the University of Virginia in 1997, teaching as an assistant professor of education and politics. He has also taught at Johns Hopkins University from 2017-2021. In 2002, he published a paper, entitled "Tear Down This Wall", arguing for a "radical overhaul of teacher certification" in order to create competition for teaching positions and to help troubled districts fill their staffing gaps with talented teachers. Hess drew much attention for the paper, making his controversial case in venues ranging from the White House to the National Press Club. In an interview with Harvard Ed Magazine, Hess remarked that fallout from his paper was one of the reasons for his eventual departure from the University of Virginia. Despite the controversy, as former U.S. Assistant Secretary of Education Chester Finn explained, the paper enhanced his reputation as an "education renegade" and helped position Hess at the forefront of the education reform movement.

== Current work ==
In 2002, Hess became the founding director and resident fellow of the education policy studies program at the American Enterprise Institute.

While at AEI, Hess has hosted public events with policymakers to discuss their visions for reforming American education. He has hosted conferences and research events on topics including the future of education philanthropy, civics and citizenship education, Common Core state standards, and ed policy lessons from the Bush-Obama years of education reform. He's also hosted events with keynote speakers across the ideological and political spectrum including Success Academies Charter School Founder Eva Moskowitz; Secretaries of Education Arne Duncan, Betsy DeVos, and Rod Paige; historian and pundit Diane Ravitch; and American Federation of Teachers president Randi Weingarten.

Hess has authored or edited more than 35 books, each exploring various elements of K-12 and higher education. His most-cited works are Spinning Wheels, Learning to Lead, School Boards at the Dawn of the 21st Century, Revolution at the Margins, and Common Sense School Reform.

In Cagebusting Leadership (2013) and The Cagebusting Teacher (2015), Hess argues that although policies, rules, and regulations can be a barrier to school improvement, leaders often have more freedom to transform teaching and learning than they believe. Drawing upon extensive interviews, he examines how school leaders can overcome barriers to reform.

Along with Pedro A. Noguera, dean of USC’s Rossier School of Education, Hess coauthored the 2021 book In Search of Common Ground: Conversations About the Toughest Questions in K-12 Education, which won the Association of American Publishers' 2022 PROSE Award in Education Practice and Theory. After the book's publication, Hess and Noguera debuted the Common Ground podcast.

Hess has authored research articles and more general commentaries for scholarly and popular outlets such as Teachers College Record, Harvard Education Review, Phi Delta Kappan, Educational Leadership, U.S. News & World Report, National Affairs, the Washington Post, the New York Times, The Wall Street Journal, The Atlantic, and National Review.

Hess also has taught at the University of Pennsylvania, Georgetown University, Rice University, Johns Hopkins University, and Harvard University.

Hess is the founder of AEI’s Conservative Education Reform Network, which includes hundreds of the nation's most influential conservative educators and education policy makers and hosts the "Sketching a New Conservative Education Agenda series."

Distilling knowledge from over twenty-five years working in and around school reform, Hess has become a leading voice on issues including the Common Core, No Child Left Behind, school choice, education technology, the role of for-profits in education, education philanthropy, and the impact of education research. Under Hess, AEI Education has grown into a predominant center of conservative thought for K-12 and higher education policy. An article by the Harvard Graduate School of Education publication Ed Magazine referred to Hess as "one of America's most influential and respected" education policy experts for his ability to "craft controversial arguments, challenge conventional thought, and make his strong opinions known."

In 2021, Washingtonian magazine named Hess one of Washington's ten most influential figures in education. In 2022, 2023, 2024, and 2025, Hess was again named by Washingtonian Magazine as one of Washington DC's most influential people shaping education policy. In 2022, an analysis found that Hess, of all the education researchers at the nation's major think tanks, had the most scholarly influence.

== Select publications ==
=== Books ===
- Getting Education Right: A Conservative Vision for Improving Early Childhood, K-12, and College (with Michael Q. McShane, 2024)
- The Great School Rethink (2023)
- A Search for Common Ground: Conversations About the Toughest Questions in K-12 Education (with Pedro Noguera, 2021)
- Letters to a Young Education Reformer (2017)
- The Cage-Busting Teacher (2015)
- Breakthrough Leadership in the Digital Age: Using Learning Science to Reboot Schooling (with Bror Saxberg, 2014)
- Cage-Busting Leadership (2013)
- The Same Thing Over and Over: How School Reformers Get Stuck in Yesterday’s Ideas (2010)
- Education Unbound: The Promise and Practice of Greenfield Schooling (2010)
- No Child Left Behind (with Michael J. Petrilli, 2007)
- Tough Love for Schools: Essays on Competition, Accountability, and Excellence (2006)
- Common Sense School Reform (2004)
- Revolution at the Margins: The Impact of Competition on Urban School Systems (2002)
- Bringing the Social Sciences Alive (1999)
- Spinning Wheels: The Politics of Urban School Reform (1998)

In addition to books and edited volumes, Hess has published a number of scholarly research reports, including School Boards at the Dawn of the 21st Century; A Better Bargain: Overhauling Teacher Collective Bargaining for the 21st Century; Learning to Lead: What Gets Taught in Principal Preparation Programs; Diplomas and Dropouts: Which Colleges Actually Graduate Their Students (and Which Don’t); School Boards Circa 2010: Governance in the Accountability Era; Reauthorization of the Elementary and Secondary Education Act Offers a New Chance to Improve Education; Partnership Is a Two-Way Street: What It Takes for Business to Help Drive School Reform; and multiple entries in lead publications with the U.S. Chamber of Commerce.
