= Sanford Levinson =

American legal scholar (born 1941)

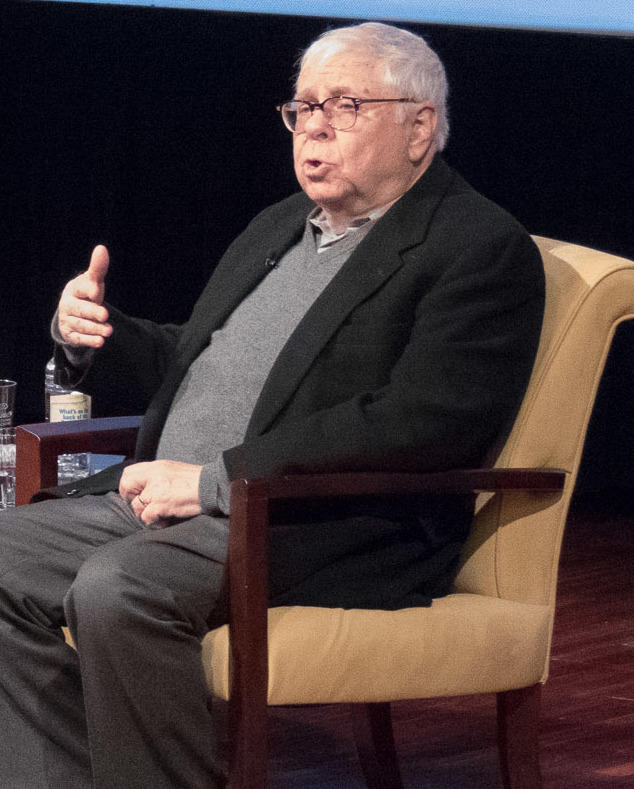
- Levinson in 2017
- Born: June 17, 1941 (age 85); Hendersonville, North Carolina, U.S.
- Education: Duke University (BA); Harvard University (PhD); Stanford University (JD)
- Known for: Our Undemocratic Constitution
- Spouse: Cynthia
- Children: 2 (including Meira)
- Scientific career
- Fields: Constitutional law
- Workplaces: University of Texas

Sanford Victor Levinson (born June 17, 1941) is an American legal scholar known for his writings on U.S. constitutional law. A professor at the University of Texas Law School, Levinson is notable for his criticism of the United States Constitution as well as excessive presidential power and has been widely quoted on such topics as the Second Amendment, gay marriage, nominations to the Supreme Court, and other legal issues. He has called for a Second Constitutional Convention of the United States.

== Early life and education ==
Levinson was born on June 17, 1941, in Hendersonville, North Carolina. He is Jewish. After graduating from Duke University in 1962 with a Bachelor of Arts, Levinson earned a Ph.D. in government from Harvard University in 1969. He then attended Stanford Law School, graduating with a J.D. in 1973.

== Academic career ==
Levinson was a member of the department of Politics at Princeton. Levinson taught law at Georgetown, Yale, Harvard, New York University, Boston University, Central European University in Budapest, Panthéon-Assas University, the Hebrew University in Jerusalem, Shalom Hartman Institute in Jerusalem London, Auckland and Melbourne. In 2001, Levinson was elected to the American Academy of Arts and Sciences. In 2010, he was given the Lifetime Achievement Award by the Law and Courts Section of the American Political Science Association. In 1980, he joined the University of Texas School of Law at Austin, Texas, where he is also a professor of government. He holds the W. St. John Garwood and W. St. John Garwood Jr. Centennial Chair in Law.

== Books, scholarship, activism ==
Levinson is quoted often in publications about numerous legal topics. He has described himself as "a card-carrying A.C.L.U. member who doesn't own a gun" and has argued that the Second Amendment of the United States Constitution limits the government's authority to regulate private gun ownership. Levinson's opinions on constitutional law, including his opinions about Second Amendment cases, have been reported in the media. Levinson has been a panelist on programs sponsored by the Association of American Law Schools and has spoken on topics alongside prominent lawyers such as Kenneth W. Starr. Levinson has been identified as a "prominent liberal law professor" and been grouped with other professors including Laurence H. Tribe of Harvard and Akhil Reed Amar of Yale. Levinson's opinion has been cited during the nominating process for Supreme Court nominees.

Levinson has been critical of Supreme Court justices who have stayed in office despite medical deterioration stemming from age; for example, Levinson criticized Chief Justice William H. Rehnquist for a "degree of egoistic narcissism" by declaring six weeks before his death his intention to stay on. Levinson has called for term limits for Supreme Court justices, as has a growing list of "scholars across the ideological spectrum." He has published comments critical of life tenure for Supreme Court justices.

Levinson is particularly noted for his 1989 "seminal article" in the Yale Law Journal entitled "The Embarrassing Second Amendment". He argued that the Second Amendment offers neither gun rights advocates nor gun control advocates a refuge. He argued "society must decide the issue of gun control on practical as well as on constitutional grounds ... the issue is to what extent does the Second Amendment permit the Government to do what it wants in controlling firearms, just as we have to establish the extent to which it can limit speech or break into your house without a warrant. Levinson has criticized liberal lawyers as treating "the Second Amendment as the equivalent of an embarrassing relative whose mention brings a quick change of subject." He has argued that the Constitution protects some personal ownership of firearms but admits that "courts are likely to rule that Congress can do almost anything short of an outright prohibition of owning guns." Levinson's article was cited in Supreme Court Justice Clarence Thomas' concurring opinion in Printz v. United States.

Levinson taught a course called Torture, Law and Lawyers at Harvard Law School in 2005. Levinson has written essays in The New York Times. Levinson edited Torture: A Collection (2005). A reviewer commented: "What's most striking about these essays is that despite their abstract and theoretical content, they generally do not contradict the depiction of actual interrogators described by Mackey and Miller. The wall between the liberal campus and a conservative, utilitarian-minded military breaks down because the questions are so serious that few of this book's contributors want to engage in polemics, and few – to their credit – ever seem completely comfortable with their own conclusions."

Levinson has been a critic of the unitary executive and excessive presidential power. In the magazine Dissent, he argued that "constitutional dictators have become the American norm." Presidents "have an incentive to declare emergencies" and assume "quasi-dictatorial powers," wrote Levinson. Levinson was highly critical of president George W. Bush who he regarded as possibly the "absolutely worst president." Levinson notes that President Obama seems likely to repeat the pattern of expansive presidential power. He wrote an essay titled "The Decider Can Become a Dictator" in which he criticized a system which allows presidents to make dictatorial decisions of great consequence without providing ways to discipline those who display bad judgment. Levinson commented about a ban on gay marriage proposed by former President George W. Bush in legal terms as a Constitutional issue.

Levinson has criticized the Constitution (invoking comparisons to Thomas Jefferson) for what he considers to be its numerous failings, including an inability to remove the President despite lack of confidence by lawmakers and the public, the President's veto power as being "extraordinarily undemocratic", the difficulty of enacting Constitutional amendments through Article 5 and a lack of more representation in the Senate for highly populated states such as California. He also criticizes the primary process in which important states which aren't considered "battleground states" are ignored by presidential candidates. He's often called for a Second Constitutional Convention: "We ought to think about it almost literally every day, and then ask, 'Well, to what extent is government organized to realize the noble visions of the preamble?' That the preamble begins, 'We the people.' It's a notion of a people that can engage in self-determination." Levinson's book Our Undemocratic Constitution: Where the Constitution Goes Wrong (and How We the People Can Correct It) calls for "wholesale revision of our nation's founding document."

Levinson appeared on the Bill Moyers television program in 2007. Levinson's research interests include American Constitutional development, Constitutional design, law, religion, multiculturalism, society, and theories of Constitutional interpretation. Levinson participates in a blog called Balkinization, which focuses on constitutional, First Amendment, and other civil liberties issues, as well as a blog called Our Undemocratic Constitution. With Jeffrey K. Tulis, he is co-editor of the Johns Hopkins Series in Constitutional Thought and also of a new series, Constitutional Thinking at University Press of Kansas.

== Personal life ==
Levinson and his wife, children's writer Cynthia Levinson, have two daughters: philosopher Meira and lawyer Rachel.

== Publications ==
- Levinson, Sanford (2005). Torture: A Collection. Oxford University Press, USA. ISBN 978-0-19-517289-8.
- Levinson, Sanford (1988). Constitutional Faith.
- Levinson, Sanford (1998). Written in Stone: Public Monuments in Changing Societies.
- Levinson, Sanford (2003). Wrestling With Diversity.
- Levinson, Sanford (2006). Our Undemocratic Constitution: Where the Constitution Goes Wrong (and How We the People Can Correct It). Oxford; New York: Oxford University Press. ISBN 0-19-530751-8.
- Levinson, Sanford (2012). Framed: America's 51 Constitutions and the Crisis of Governance.
- Levinson, Sanford; Balkin, Jack M. (November 2012). "The Dangerous Thirteenth Amendment". Columbia Law Review. 112 (7). Columbia Law School: 1459–1499. JSTOR 41708156. Archived from the original on 2015-11-17. Pdf.

== See also ==
- Second Constitutional Convention of the United States
