= Public consultation =

Process to get public input

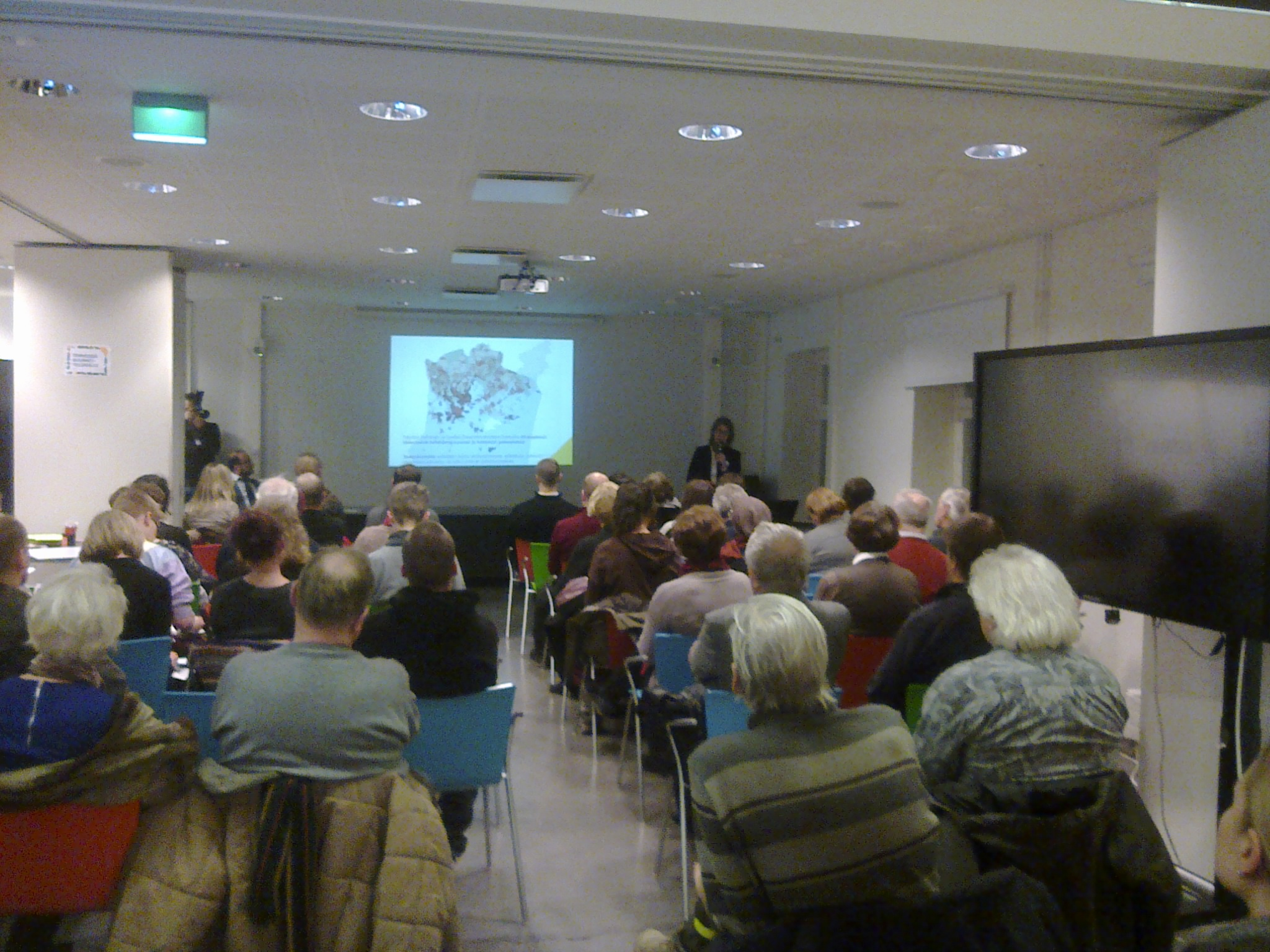
A public consultation event for urban planning in Helsinki

Public consultation, public comment, or simply consultation, is a process by which members of the public are asked for input on public issues. This can occur in public meetings open to all (such as town hall meetings), in written form (such as in public comment or surveys), as well as in deliberative groups (such as citizens' assemblies or citizen juries). Surveys and deliberative groups can be conducted with self-selected citizens or with statistically representative samples of the population which enables the identification of majority opinion. Its main goals are to improve public involvement and influence, as well as the transparency and efficiency of government projects, laws, or regulations.

Public consultation usually involves notification (to publicize the matter to be consulted on), consultation (a two-way flow of information and opinion exchange) as well as participation (involving stakeholders in the drafting of policy or legislation). There are a variety of consultation methods, but they all involve the provision of background information on the issue, and the opportunity for deliberation on the regulation, law or plan under consideration.

While public consultations have historically been undertaken by governments, they have been increasingly conducted by non-governmental organizations, including university programs and non-profit organizations.

While intended to enhance democracy and give the general population an opportunity to learn and comment on public policy, numerous studies have shown that public consultation meetings tend to unrepresentative of the general population, with meetings dominated by older, wealthier, whiter residents and homeowners. Public consultation is also controversial for its role in hindering and delaying development and infrastructure.

== History ==
The basis for public comment is found in general political theory of constitutional democracy as originated during and after the Enlightenment, particularly by Rousseau. This basis was elaborated in the American Revolution, and various thinkers such as Benjamin Franklin, Thomas Jefferson and Thomas Paine are associated with the rejection of tyrannical, closed government decision making in favor of open government. The tradition of the New England Town Hall is believed to be rooted in this early American movement, and the distillation of formal public comment in official proceedings in the United States is a direct application of this format in the workings of public administration itself.

A frequently used tool for understanding different levels of community participation in consultation is known as Arnstein's ladder, although some academics contest that Arnstein's ladder is contextually specific and was not intended to be a universal tool.

== Public meetings ==
Common instances of public meetings include meetings convened by legislators or other elected officials, such as town halls open to all. Governing bodies also hold public hearings to get input on specific issue areas, however these are not open to all, as participants are selected by the governing body due to their expertise or representation of stakeholders.

== Public comment ==
Email, surveys, and social media offer relatively accessible forms of consultation, lowering the barriers of time and travel required to participate.

Governing bodies, as well as regulatory agencies often have periods of public comment before a new regulation or project is enacted, to allow for ordinary citizens and stakeholders to provide input.

A 2023 report cautions, however, that AI-generated text, (such as from bots on social media) may result in illegitimate feedback in addition to legitimate testimony and opinions.

A specific class of public comment is requested by agencies seeking input on draft policy documents such as environmental impact reports. This type of comment may pertain to an intended action, such as permit issuance, or the classification of a particular species of plant or animal as endangered. Other instances occur with regard to publication of draft environmental impact reports, which comments are then answered and may be reflected in subsequent revisions to the document. Typically there is a notice of completion of the draft which is posted in the newspaper, on the web, and is mailed to known interested parties who may be designated as "stakeholders" or simply "interested parties". A public comment period is established and comments which are received by the cutoff date become part of the official public record. In some cases, there is a statutory mandate that those comments be replied to or incorporated in some fashion into the Final document in advance of the deadline, which provides commentators with an opportunity to view the remarks of others before committing themselves in writing. A government portal which may allow review of comments and opportunity for making comment and can be searched by keyword.

The Estonian government's public consultation website, Teeme koos, has been noted by the European Commission as a good practice example.

Sweden has a mandatory consultation period of three months for all proposed major legislation.

== Public consultation with representative samples ==
One important dividing line between the various methods of public consultation is whether the participants are self-selected or if the participants are a representative sample of the population. It is only through representative samples that one can use the findings of a public consultation to characterize the distribution of views in the general population including the identification of majority views.

To achieve a representative sample the ideal method is a purely random selection of the population, but reasonably representative samples can still be achieved by opt-in samples by stratifying the sample in advance and weighting it afterwards according to key demographic variables in the population, as well as ensuring that the universe of potential respondents drawn from does not have evident biases. (see Sampling).

Methods that use representative samples are public consultation surveys and many of the deliberative groups based on the idea of creating mini-publics such as deliberative polls, citizen assemblies, citizen juries, and in some cases participatory budgeting. Public comment periods, public hearings, and town halls, are generally not done with representative samples, nor are some of the surveys used by government agencies and NGOs. Such non-representative methods may however give an indication of the views of self-selected activists and individuals or organizations who have an interest in the issue at hand.

=== Deliberative assemblies ===
A growing trend, especially in Europe and the Commonwealth countries, is for citizens to meet for an in-depth deliberation on an important policy issue and deliver their conclusions to the government. The groups that meet are usually representative samples and are thus called "mini-publics." Representativeness is often achieved by using a random selection of lay citizens (sortition). They meet, usually in person, for as little as one or as many as five days, or for shorter regular meeting periods over a longer period. They are briefed by experts on the issue, have discussions, and in the end vote on some type of final recommendation. In some cases, members of the general public may submit questions or comments to the mini-public, which are then discussed in their meetings.

One of the first forms of such deliberative assemblies were "citizens' juries" developed in the United States by Ned Crosby at the Jefferson Institute in Minneapolis, Minnesota. Citizen juries are small representative samples of several dozen participants that meet for several intensive days.

Citizens' assemblies are usually larger than citizen juries with a sample of one hundred to five hundred citizens. Citizens' assemblies have been initiatives of the government in British Columbia and Ontario, the Netherlands, the Republic of Ireland, Poland, France, the United Kingdom, and Australia.

They have also been initiated by NGOs, such as the Le G1000 in Belgium, the We The Citizens project in Ireland, and The People's Parliament in UK. A citizens' assembly has also been convened on the global level: The Global Assembly was organized in 2021 to deliberate on climate change policies before the start of the international climate change conference COP26. It is the first body that can make any claim to represent the democratic wishes of the global population as a whole.

=== Public consultation surveys ===
Public consultation surveys are surveys on policy proposals or positions that have been put forward by legislators, government officials, or other policy leader. The entirety of the deliberative process takes place within the survey. For each issue, respondents are provided relevant briefing materials, and arguments for and against various proposals. Respondents then provide their final recommendation. Public consultation surveys are primarily done with large representative samples, usually several thousand nationally and several hundred in subnational jurisdictions.

Public consultation surveys have been used since the 1990s in the US. The American Talks Issue Foundation led by Alan Kay played a pioneering role. The largest such program is the Program for Public Consultation at the University of Maryland's School of Public Policy, directed by Steven Kull, conducting public consultation surveys on the national level, as well as in states and congressional districts. They have gathered public opinion data on over 300 policy proposals that have been put forward by Members of Congress and the Executive Branch, in a variety of areas. Such surveys conducted in particular Congressional districts have also been used as the basis for face-to-face forums in congressional districts, in which survey participants and House Congressional Representative discuss the policy proposals and the results of the survey.

=== Deliberative opinion polls ===
Deliberative opinion polling combines surveys of a representative sample of the population on their policy preferences together with face-to-face deliberation. The sample (usually several hundred) is surveyed in advance and then is provided briefing materials on the issue, and arguments for and against various policy proposals. They then participate in a face-to-face process in which experts with different policy orientations make presentations, and participants discuss the issues among themselves and with the experts. In the end, participants repeat the survey on their policy preferences.

Deliberative opinion polling was developed by James Fishkin, and is currently run by the Deliberative Democracy Lab at Stanford University. Deliberative opinion polls have been used in the United States, the European Union, China, Australia, Mongolia, and South Korea. This method was the basis of the American in One Room event, in which a representative sample of several hundred Americans gathered in-person to deliberate on and make their recommendations for dozens of policy issues.

== Participatory budgeting ==
Participatory budgeting involves a sample of ordinary people, sometimes representative, making decisions about their government's budget through a process of democratic deliberation and decision-making. Participants recommend how a government's overall budget should be allocated among its various spending areas, or decide on whether to implement proposed public spending projects.

Frameworks of participatory budgeting differ throughout the globe in terms of scale, procedure, and objective. Participatory budgeting is often contextualized to suit a region's particular conditions and needs. In many cases, participatory budgeting has been legally enforced and regulated; however, some are internally arranged and promoted by NGOs.

Participatory budgeting was first developed in the 1980s by the Brazilian Workers' Party (PT), and since then it has manifested itself in a myriad of designs, with variations in methodology, form, and technology. It has been implemented in nearly 1,500 municipalities and institutions around the world.

== Authoritarian systems ==
Authoritarian systems generally tend to take a dim view of public consultation. In the writings of Benito Mussolini, he expressed the view that fascism offers "free" speech, but only to persons who were "qualified" to have an opinion. Similarly, in the historical development of Nazism, public commentators at official NSDAP rallies were not infrequently beaten by the mob, or, if there were large numbers supporting the adverse commentator, brawls broke out. In today's People's Republic of China, public comment on government policy is considered inappropriate, and may result in long prison terms for persons such as Wei Jingsheng.

The Hungarian Fidesz government has employed so-called National Consultations, sending questionnaires to citizens that survey their opinions on government policy and legislation while pushing the Fidesz governments' ideology and agenda with suggestive questions (e.g. by referring to a supposed "Soros plan" to "convince Brussels to resettle at least one million immigrants from Africa and the Middle East annually on the territory of the European Union, including Hungary", that this "is part of the Soros plan to launch political attacks on countries objecting to immigration and impose strict penalties on them", and asking citizens whether they agree, or blasting "Brussels bureaucrats" in a consultation about family policy). On other occasions, such as just prior to elections, the government sent letters notifying citizens that it will reduce their gas payments by €38, or sent pensioners gift vouchers. The Fidesz government has also carried out taxpayer-funded "information campaigns", or "national messaging initiatives", that have denounced supposed enemies of Hungary with budgets of tens of millions of euros per year.

== Criticism ==
The representativeness of public consultations has been questioned. Data-driven public consultations can in some cases become polarized.

== See also ==
- Freedom
- Freedom of speech
- Mandate (politics)
- Participation (decision making)
- Stakeholder theory
- Symbolic speech
