= Global Assembly =

Deliberative global democratic citizens' assembly

The Global Assembly is a global citizens' assembly consisting of one hundred persons from around the world chosen by sortition to discuss issues facing the world as a whole, starting with climate change. It is a joint initiative of several bodies including the Iswe Foundation, Danish Board of Technology, and the Centre for Deliberative Democracy and Global Governance at the University of Canberra and has multiple funders including the Scottish Government and the European Climate Foundation and is supported by the United Nations. On 30 October 2021, the Assembly produced the first statement that has any claim to democratically represent the voice of humanity in the form of an interim statement.

== History ==
Under the influence of Jürgen Habermas, political science began to focus on how communities and populations develop a common will through communication in the public sphere resulting in the development of deliberative democracy. The concept of a citizens' assembly was first developed in the form of a deliberative poll by James Fishkin in 1988, intended to model the conclusions a community would make if it were able to meet together and engage in informed deliberation on the issues. In 2011, John Dryzek and others proposed that global citizens' assemblies should be convened to discuss questions of international diplomacy as an effective and relatively cheap democratic exercise to identify the will of the global population.

== The First Global Assembly ==
The First Global Assembly was timed to coincide with COP26 in Glasgow in October–November 2021. The Assembly consisted of one hundred people from one hundred locations around the world selected by geospatial sortition (global civic lottery), i.e. random geographical locations weighted by population density, to be representative of the world's population. The Assembly was selected from lists of people identified at these locations by local community organisations, to provide a representative sample of the global population. The Assembly was to answer the question "How can humanity address the climate and ecological crisis in a fair and effective way?", and was informed by scientists about the causes and effects of climate change and ecological crisis.

On 30 October 2021, the Assembly produced an interim statement and it made a final Declaration on 18 December 2021. The Declaration endorses the Paris Agreement and the Universal Declaration of Human Rights, and calls for the recognition of the human right to a clean environment and the international crime of ecocide. It also endorses participatory approaches to the climate crisis and calls for a fair and just energy transition.

== Controversy ==
The Global Assembly’s Executive Summary, under the heading ‘Key Achievements,’ lists the participant selection method as the first of its methodological innovations: "New sortition methodology: A multi-step global civic lottery was developed, including an algorithm for location lottery and method of local recruitment." The question of who authored the participant selection methodology is contested, however. (See footnote 12 of Evaluation Report.)

== Future ==
The Global Assembly intends to continue to convene and to expand participation to ten million persons from around the world by 2030.

== See also ==
- Climate assembly
