= Deliberation Day =

Proposed social issues-centric holiday in the United States

Deliberation Day is a proposed national holiday in the United States aimed at enhancing democratic engagement through structured public discussions prior to major elections. Conceived by the constitutional law scholar Bruce Ackerman and the political scientist James S. Fishkin, who laid out the rationale for their proposal in their 2005 book, Deliberation Day, the initiative seeks to foster informed citizen participation in the electoral process.

== Proposed structure ==
Ackerman and Fishkin propose that Deliberation Day would occur two weeks before major elections, with government-sponsored events held in accessible community spaces such as schools and civic centers. Attendees would engage in structured conversations facilitated by trained moderators. The day’s schedule would be divided into sessions featuring discussions among small groups, large assemblies for expert presentations, and question-and-answer segments with political representatives. Participants would receive financial compensation to incentivize broad involvement, particularly among individuals less inclined toward political participation.

== Arguments in support ==
=== Informing the electorate ===
Deliberation Day would offer participants access to balanced briefing materials and expert insights, enabling them to make well-informed decisions at the polls. This approach addresses the issue of voters making choices based on limited or biased information, thereby enhancing the overall quality of electoral outcomes.

=== Enhancing democratic engagement ===
Supporters argue that Deliberation Day would deepen democratic engagement. By allocating time for citizens to deliberate on electoral matters, the initiative aims to transform passive voters into active participants. This process encourages individuals to consider diverse perspectives, leading to more informed voting decisions. Experiments in deliberative democracy have shown that such engagement reduces polarization and fosters mutual respect among participants, even amid significant disagreements.

=== Improving public discourse ===
Deliberation Day seeks to elevate the quality of public discourse by providing a platform for reasoned discussion. In small groups, citizens would deliberate on key campaign issues, guided by balanced informational materials and moderated discussions. This structure ensures that various viewpoints are considered, promoting a more comprehensive understanding of complex topics. Such deliberative settings have been found to prevent discussions from devolving into unproductive arguments, instead facilitating productive exchanges where participants are open to changing their minds based on new evidence.

=== Counteracting political polarization ===
In an era marked by increasing political polarization, supporters argue that Deliberation Day offers a means to bridge divides. By bringing together individuals from diverse backgrounds to discuss political issues, the initiative encourages empathy and reduces partisan animosity. Deliberative processes have been shown to blunt polarization, as participants listen to and respect differing viewpoints, fostering a more cohesive society.

== Criticism ==
=== Financial and logistical challenges ===
Critics of the proposed holiday cite the substantial financial burden associated with compensating participants. Providing monetary incentives to all citizens nationwide could lead to significant expenses for governmental institutions. Additionally, organizing such a large-scale event presents logistical complexities, including the recruitment and training of moderators, securing appropriate venues, and ensuring equitable access across diverse communities.

=== Potential for group polarization ===
Empirical studies suggest that deliberation among like-minded individuals can lead to group polarization, where discussions reinforce and intensify pre-existing views, resulting in more extreme positions. For instance, an experiment involving citizens from predominantly liberal and conservative cities demonstrated that intra-group deliberation increased ideological divisions, reducing diversity of thought within groups.

=== Influence of existing political structures ===
Critics argue that Deliberation Day may inadvertently reinforce existing political structures, particularly the two-party system, by relying on major political parties to organize and manage deliberative sessions. This reliance could marginalize alternative viewpoints and limit the scope of discussions, thereby constraining the deliberative process.

=== Challenges in ensuring fair deliberation ===
Ensuring fair and balanced deliberation is another significant challenge. The assumption that structured time limits and the presence of moderators can guarantee equitable participation may be overly optimistic. In practice, discussions could be dominated by more vocal participants, leading to unequal representation of perspectives and potential conflicts among participants.

== Reception ==
Writer and activist Naomi Wolf endorsed the idea in 2008, citing studies that describe 3 of every 4 participants finding their deliberative experience very valuable.

== See also ==
- Deliberative opinion poll
- Electoral reform in the United States
