= Good Society =

Good Society may refer to:

- The Good Society, an academic journal published by the Penn State University Press since 1991
- Good Society (game), an indie role-playing game based on the novels of Jane Austen
- Good society, accepted standards of behavior in a given society.
