= World Wide Views =

Citizen engagement initiative

World Wide News
- Founded: 2009
- Founder: Danish Board of Technology

World Wide Views is an international citizen engagement initiative coordinated by the Danish Board of Technology Foundation.

It was launched in 2009 during the World-Wide Views on Global Warming project. The Alliance aims to integrate public participation into international policy processes, particularly those concerning climate and environmental governance. Over time, the network has expanded to include new partners worldwide, contributing to institutional capacity building in countries and organizations with limited prior experience in large-scale citizen deliberation.

== Method ==
The World Wide Views methodology is grounded in deliberative democracy. Each partner organization within the World Wide Views Alliance selects a demographically diverse group of citizens to participate in structured meetings. Prior to these meetings, participants receive standardized information materials developed by experts to ensure a common baseline of knowledge.

Citizen meetings are typically structured into multiple sessions, each focusing on a specific theme. Sessions begin with a short introductory video summarizing key points, followed by group discussions at tables of 7–8 participants. Discussions are facilitated by neutral moderators. At the end of each session, participants cast anonymous votes in response to predetermined questions.

The results from each country are uploaded in real time to an online platform, allowing for global comparison. Meetings are held simultaneously across participating nations, enabling synchronized international feedback.

Coordination and training for all meetings are managed by the Danish Board of Technology.

== World Wide Views on Global Warming ==
The World Wide Views on Global Warming was the first large-scale global citizen consultation focused on climate policy. Held on 26 September 2009, the project involved approximately 4,000 citizens across 38 countries and six continents. The initiative was timed ahead of the United Nations Climate Conference (COP15) in Copenhagen in December 2009.

Participants were provided with information on key climate change topics and took part in day-long meetings to deliberate and vote on a series of standardized questions. The goal was to collect informed public input on issues central to the international climate negotiations. The project aimed to demonstrate a scalable model for including citizen perspectives in global policy discussions. It produced a set of comparable results across countries, offering insights into public views on climate change that were shared with policymakers in the lead-up to COP15.

== World Wide Views on Biodiversity ==
World Wide Views on Biodiversity was held on 15 September 2012, involving 3,000 citizens from 25 countries. The project aimed to gather public perspectives on biodiversity policy issues ahead of the COP11 conference in India. Participants attended day-long meetings, received information on biodiversity topics, and voted on a series of standardized questions. The results, presented at COP11, reflected citizen views from both developed and developing countries. A majority expressed high concern over biodiversity loss and strong support for legal frameworks to expand marine protected areas.

== World Wide Views on Climate and Energy ==
The World Wide Views on Climate and Energy took place in 2015 in relation with COP21 in Paris.

It was a global citizen consultation initiative focused on climate change and energy transition. The project gathered public input on international climate and energy policy questions and presented the results to decision-makers involved in the United Nations Framework Convention on Climate Change (UNFCCC) negotiations. Organized by partners within the World Wide Views Alliance, the initiative aimed to support public engagement in international policymaking processes as such decisions increasingly occur on a global scale.
