= The People's Parliament =

1994 UK television series

The People's Parliament is a Channel 4 programme in which 90-100 randomly selected citizens, sitting in a mockup of the House of Commons of the United Kingdom, debated and voted on controversial issues. Each programme started with a motion that was then debated by a proposer and witnesses for each side, setting out the facts behind the issues and the arguments for and against the motion. Its parliamentary procedures were under the control of Lesley Riddoch who acted as its "Speaker". The participants hearing debate and voted on motions were called "Members of the People's Parliament" (MPPs) and selected to be representative of society. They made their own speeches, examined expert witnesses, and set up their own "Select committees".

It was first broadcast at 7 pm on 30 July 1994 with a programme that deliberated the motion that "Persistent young offenders between the ages of 12 and 14 should be locked up." The programme has been described as "an attempt to 're-empower' the disenfranchised electorate and explore the way in which a representative sample of people would respond to extended deliberation of difficult issues."

== Format ==
Each episode started with a motion and an initial vote was taken (for, against and abstentions). Then speeches for, and against were made. There was also some initial debate by the MPPs. Then the MPPs were next presented with the recorded deliberations of a 'Select Committee' that presented evidence on the complexities of the issue from experts. After this, in the chamber of the People's Parliament, MPPs make responses to what they have heard. Finally, there is another vote that lets the viewer see how the arguments changed the views of the MPPs who also were about to comment about how they influenced them.

The People's Parliament was shot in the House of Commons set at Granada studios in Manchester. The MPPs were selected from around Manchester and the North of England. It copied many of the aspects of Westminster in terms of the names given to the host "Madam Speaker" and participants, "MPPs". There was a set of Erskine May: Parliamentary Practice and a tinsel Ceremonial Mace. The MPPs were not paid for appearing through they received £20 to cover "transport costs". A late-night follow up phone-in programme was also sometimes transmitted. There were a pilot and five series.

== Deliberative democracy ==
The show was initiated by Peter Weil and produced by Barraclough Carey Productions. The idea of the programme came from James S. Fishkin (a consultant also to the programme) and his theories upon deliberative democracy. This is a form of direct democracy adapted for modern nation states. Direct democracy was found in Classical Greece and in some Swiss Cantons but is unsuitable for modern states due to population numbers. According to Fiskin statistical sampling can recreate the advantages of direct democracy in reflecting the views of the entire citizen body by the use of random sampling to create deliberative assemblies that reflect society in miniature. Though opinion polls engage in random sampling they measure only instant opinions, not those that people form after hearing different sides of an argument over an issue. The People's Parliament was an attempt to create such a deliberative parliament that reflected by random sampling the diversity of informed opinion of all citizens.

== Programmes ==
=== Pilot ===
A pilot was made in 1993 and broadcast on 14 November: "Benefits should only be paid for the first child born to a single parent and they should not get priority housing". Michael McKay from Liverpool, was chosen, to introduce the motion to the House, for subsequent debate. A young man, who was very articulate and passionate in his delivery of the proposal. This was later supported by comments made by the editor of the show Peter Weil. Michael went on to appear in the first twelve episodes, leaving the programme after the first series had been completed.

=== First series 1994 ===
30 July 'Persistent young offenders between the ages of 12 and 14 should be locked up.' FOR: Ch Supt John Potts, Police Superintendents' Association, AGAINST Prof Norman Tutt, executive director of Social Information Systems, Cheshire.

6 August 'Britain should prohibit the sale of military equipment to all countries which use arms for internal repression'. FOR: Nathalia Berkowitz, AGAINST John Kershaw, lecturer and member of the pro-defence British Atlantic Committee. Motion approved.

13 August 'Non-essential vehicles should be banned from city centres' FOR: Rolf Monheim, Professor in Applied Urban Geography, Bayreuth University, AGAINST: Rosemary Graham, public policy and communications manager of the Royal Automobile Club.

20 August "Recess"

27 August 'Britain should legalise all hard and soft drugs' FOR Miles Celic AGAINST: Stella Beardsmore. Motion rejected (For: 28, Against: 44).

3 September 'Workers in the essential services should not have the right to strike.' FOR: Ira Chapllin, Institute of Directors, AGAINST : Roger Poole, of the health and local government union, Unison. On eve of the Trades Union Congress. Motion rejected (For: 23, Against: 53).

10 September 'Fertility treatment should be available on the NHS to everyone over 18'. FOR: Zoe Conway. AGAINST: Elizabeth Leech. Motion approved (For: 48 Against: 21).

17 September 'Councils should have the power to set up their own police forces'. FOR: Margaret Mervis, Wandsworth Council's housing chairwoman; AGAINST: Fred Broughton, chairman-elect of the Police Federation of England and Wales. Motion rejected (For: 31, Against: 42).

24 September 'Able-bodied people who have been out of work for more than 6 months should be made to work for the community.'

1 October 'Corporal punishment should be brought back in state schools' Special edition in which 80 young people debate the motion. FOR: Wesley Soller; AGAINST: Helena Davies. Motion rejected.

8 October 'Northern Ireland should be part of a united Ireland and not the United Kingdom. Motion approved.

== Comments ==
Kenneth Wright, in the Glasgow Herald wrote of the first programme that it:

struck hell into my heart from its earliest tidings; set as it was in a slavish mock-up of the House of Commons ... To be sure, there were many present who were deeply in love with the sound of their own voices, a fair scattering of career dingbats, and two or three who looked suspiciously capable of becoming real, hectoring, righteous, boring MPs themselves one day; yet on the whole they were disappointingly non-fanatical and well-meaning. ... Lesley Riddoch, as Madam Speaker, handled the mob with wit and charm ("One singer, one song") only rarely giving the tiniest hint of the impatience that people who are paid to have opinions naturally feel for the amateur competition.

The Economist of 17 September 1994 noted that "many viewers of the "People's Parliament" have judged its debates to be of higher quality than those in the House of Commons. Members of the former, unlike the latter, appear to listen to what their fellows say."

Lesley Riddoch, noted that:

The Mother of Parliaments is also overwhelmingly male, white, able-bodied, middle-class, and university educated. The people are generally not. That awareness of the unrepresentative nature of Parliament, together with recent allegations of sleaze, has switched a lot of the public off parliamentary politics. ... Now whether The People's Parliament manages to be more animated, more passionate and more open-minded than the other place on the Thames remains to be seen. As their Speaker, I'm obviously biased. But as a journalist, I'm also fascinated by the desire of many people to believe this whole escapade can become more than just another TV series.

Simon Hoggart in a Parliamentary sketch in the Guardian upon a debate in the House of Commons observed that:

For a moment the session began to sound like one of the appalling 'People's Parliaments' on Channel Four in which members of the public contemplate the issue of juvenile custodial sentences in terms of how their car radio got nicked, and how we should take a tip from Singapore where you get flogged for leaving chewing gum under a bus seat. The People's Parliament is a quick reminder that the real one might not be so bad after all.
