= America in One Room =

2019 deliberative polling event; the largest representative sample in American history

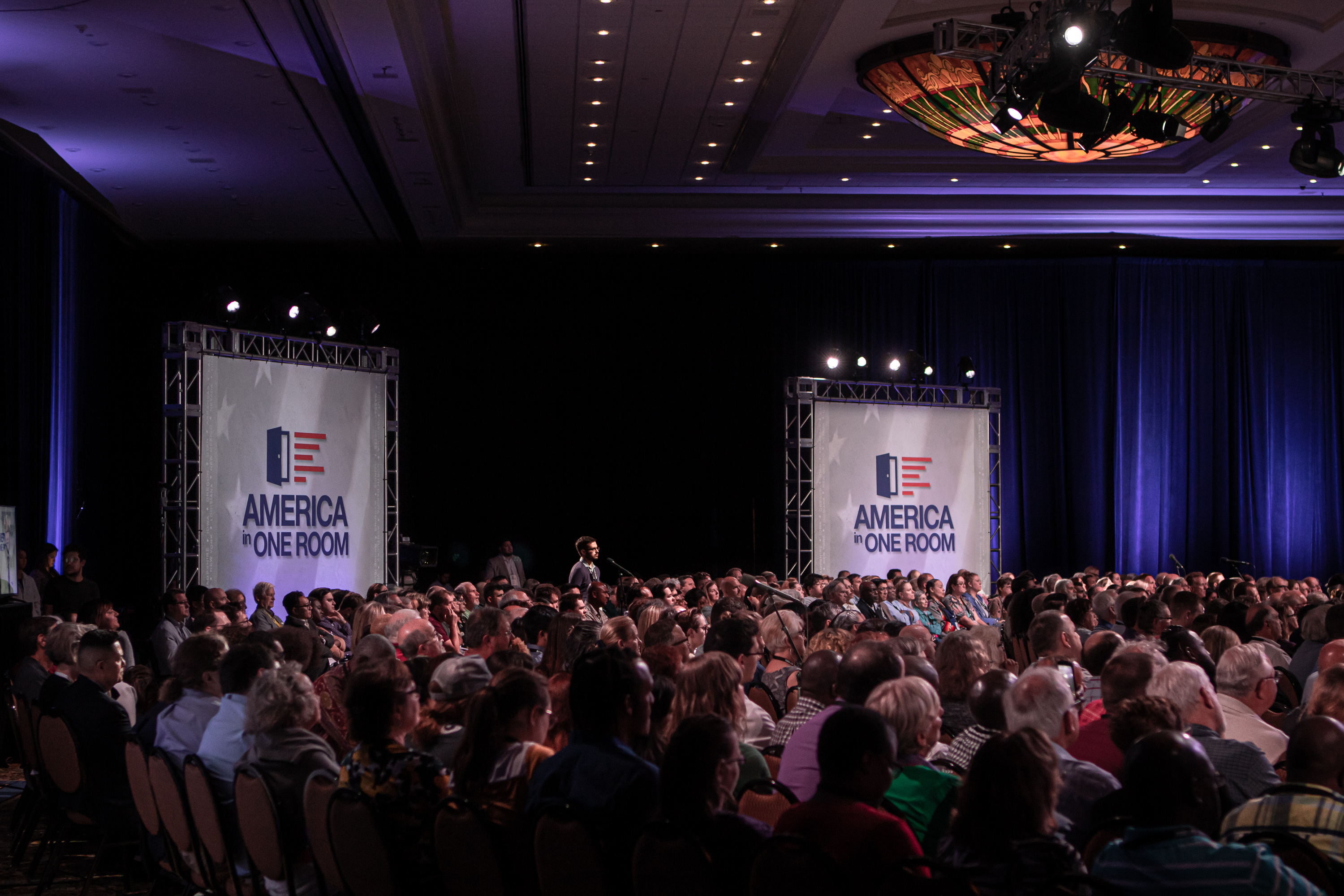
- America in One Room assembled the largest demographically representative sample of the voting electorate in US history.
- Date: September 19–22, 2019
- Location: Grapevine, Texas
- Theme: American Democracy
- Organized by: Helena, The Center for Deliberative Democracy
- Outcome: The America in One Room deliberative poll resulted in statistically significant depolarization across 5 policy areas: immigration, the economy, healthcare, foreign policy, and the environment.
- Website: https://helena.org/projects/america-in-one-room https://cdd.stanford.edu/2019/america-in-one-room/

America in One Room was a 2019 event that assembled the largest representative sample of the American voting electorate in history to discuss polarizing political issues. It utilized a method called deliberative polling, led by Stanford Professors James Fishkin and Larry Diamond of the Center for Deliberative Democracy. The event was funded and operated by Helena, an organization that implements projects to address global challenges.

== Overview ==
America in One Room took place in Grapevine, Texas. Participants, referred to as citizen delegates, received comprehensive, non-partisan briefing materials covering five issues: immigration, the economy, health care, foreign policy, and the environment. Over the course of 4 days, they discussed these issues in small, moderated groups and larger plenary sessions. During the plenaries, they had the opportunity to ask questions of presidential candidates and a bipartisan panel of experts that included Denis McDonough, Kori Schake, Judy Feder, and Douglas Holtz-Eakin.

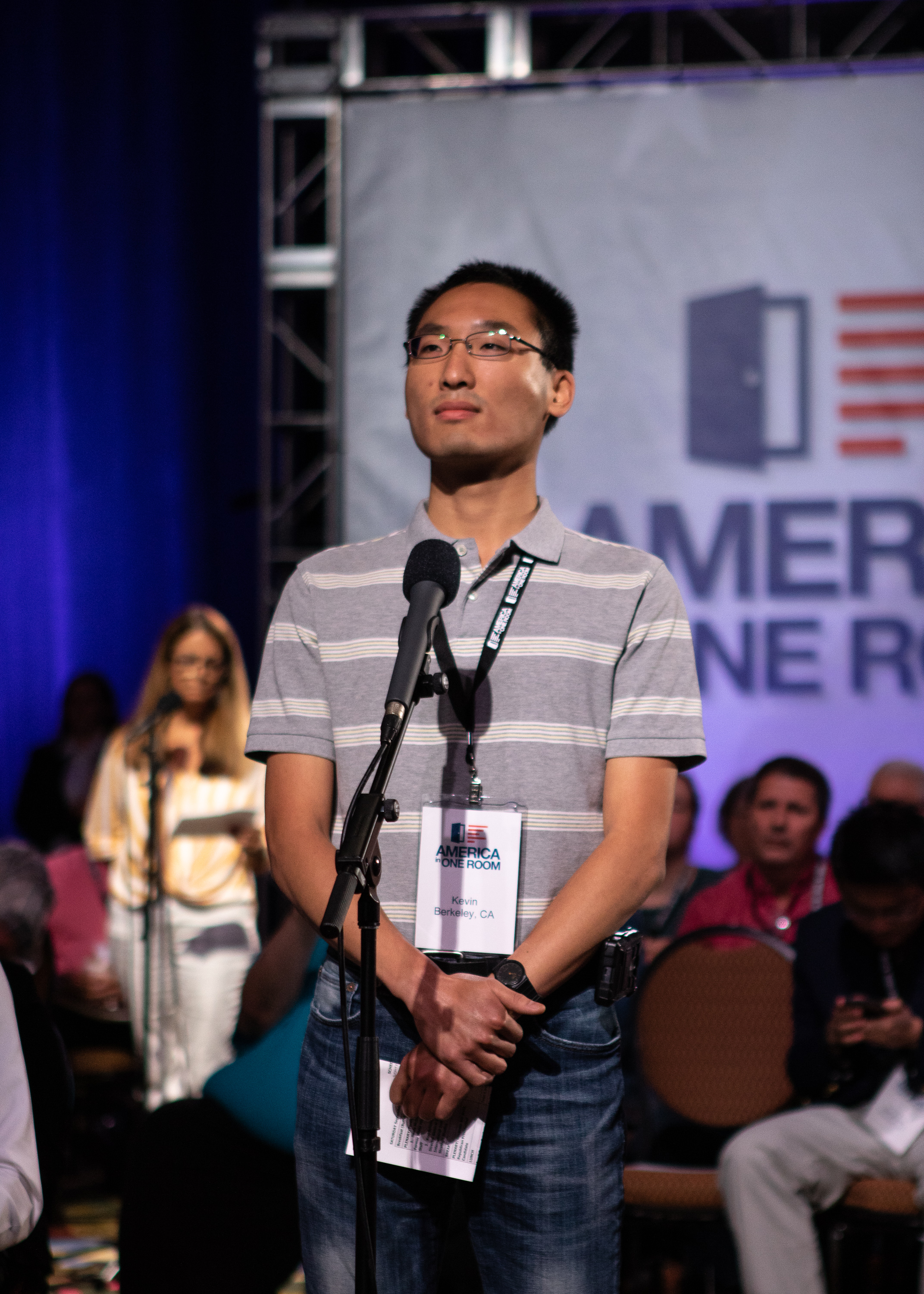
A participant asks a question during a plenary session

The citizen delegates completed an in-depth questionnaire before and after the event. After taking part in America in One Room, participants moved toward the political center on nearly every issue. In addition, the share of participants who felt that American democracy was “working well” doubled, and the percentage of those who felt that people who strongly disagreed with their views had “good reason” increased by 20 percentage points.

Fishkin, who developed the deliberative polling model, has said that the methodology is intended to measure public opinion “under good conditions” and can provide useful data for policymakers. In an interview with Josh Henry for Medium, he explained, “ultimately democracy is about connecting the will of the people to what's actually done … deliberative polling is not just a change in polling, it's a tool for facilitating the expression and measurement of the will of the people.”

America in One Room attracted widespread media attention. The New York Times dedicated a special Sunday supplement to the event that included portraits of 519 of the 523 citizen delegates.

== Sample ==
The America in One Room participants were recruited by NORC at the University of Chicago using stratified random sampling from their trademarked AmeriSpeak panel. NORC also recruited a control group of 844 polling participants who did not attend the event. Both samples were selected to approximate the demographic diversity of registered voters across age, ethnicity, gender identity, education level, geography, religious affiliation, and political ideology.

== Briefing materials ==
In advance of moderated discussions and plenary sessions, participants received a 55-page briefing document that provided background on issues identified by previous NORC polling as those most important to voters in the 2020 US election cycle, as well as arguments for and against related policy proposals. A bipartisan advisory committee and panel of experts prepared and vetted the document to ensure it reflected balanced viewpoints on each issue.

In an interview with Stanford News, Diamond noted the briefing document deliberately omitted “tribal” cues, saying, “In the ... materials and as much as possible, in the discussion, we very consciously avoided the following four words: Democrat, Republican, Trump, Obama. We tried to get people just to talk about the issues without stereotyping themselves or one another.”

== Moderated discussions ==
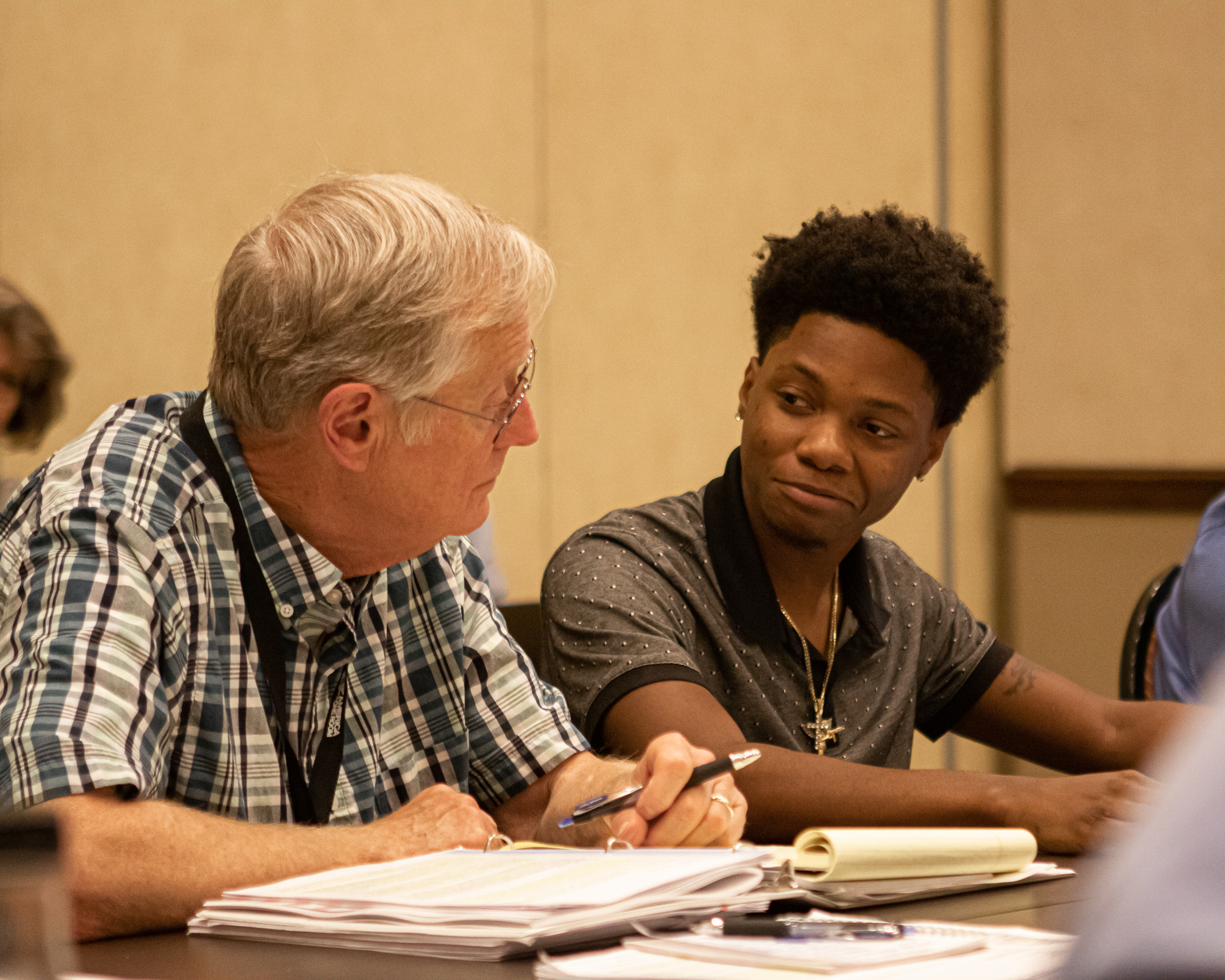
Participants debated the issues in moderated discussion groups

After reading the briefing materials, citizen delegates broke into small discussion groups led by neutral moderators who had been trained to maintain a respectful environment and encourage diverse participation. The groups debated topics including DACA, the Affordable Care Act, the Iran Nuclear Deal, and the Trans-Pacific Partnership. Writing for CNN, journalist Kyung Lah observed, “the arguments are heated but not insulting. The questions are probing with a purpose.” Afterwards, 95% of participants said that they “learned a lot about people very different from me” and nearly all (98.2%) reported that they found the experience “valuable.”

== Plenary sessions ==
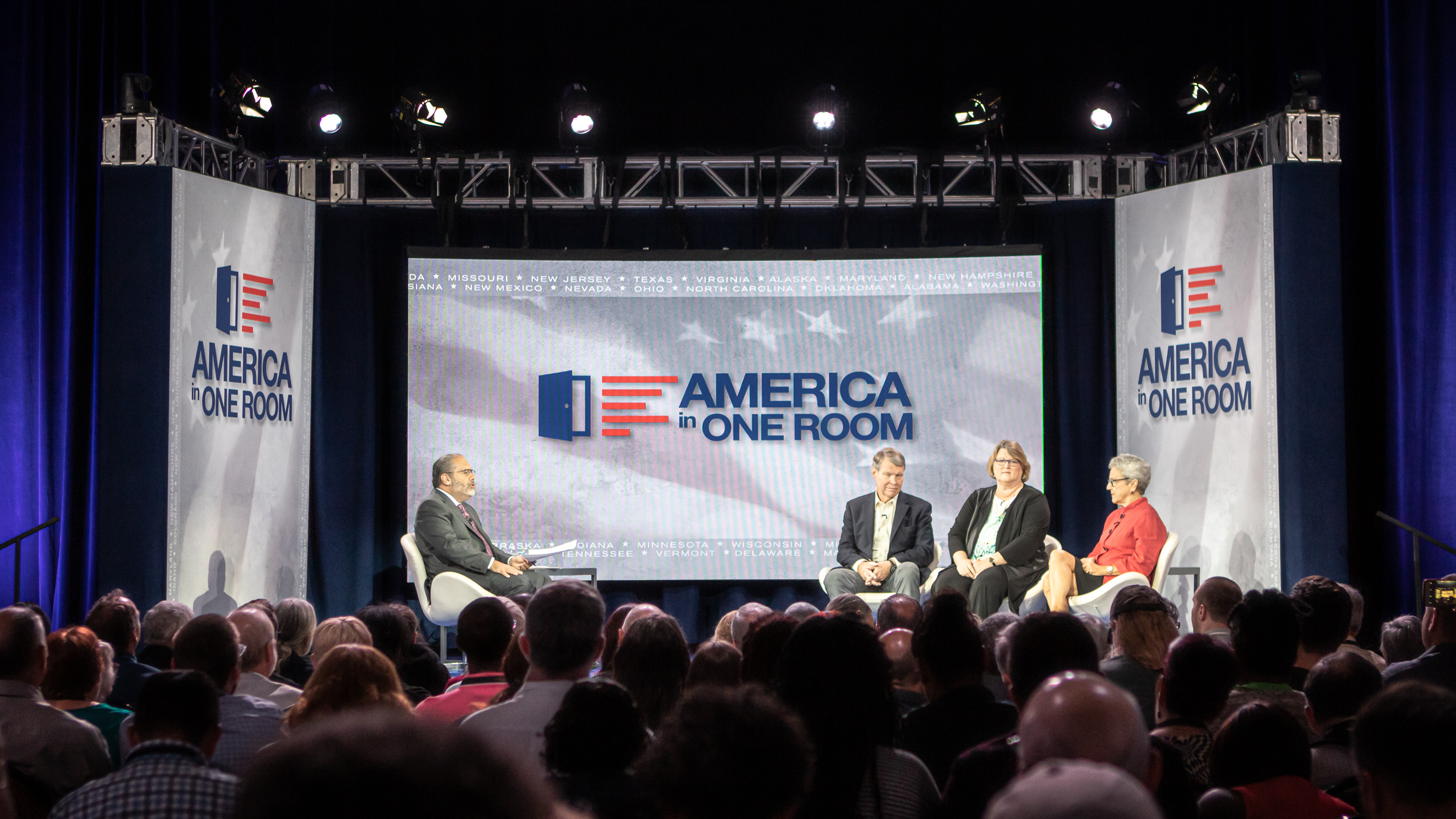
Experts discussed policy areas in plenary sessions

The group took part in five plenary sessions covering each area over the course of the weekend. These were hosted by broadcaster Ray Suarez and featured experts representing multiple perspectives on each topic. In addition, five presidential candidates (former Massachusetts Governor William Weld, former Illinois congressman Joe Walsh, former South Carolina Governor Mark Sanford, former Housing Secretary Julian Castro and Senator Michael Bennet of Colorado addressed the group. The delegates had the opportunity to ask questions of both the experts and candidates during the plenary sessions.

Experts:

Economy/ Taxes

- Jared Bernstein
- Douglas Holtz-Eakin

Environment

- Peter Goldmark
- Todd Royal

Foreign Policy

- Denis McDonough
- Kori Schake

Health Care

- Judy Feder
- Karen Politz
- Merrill Matthews

Immigration

- Theresa Cardinal Brown
- Tim Kane
- Frank Sharry

== Results ==
When the citizen delegates retook the original questionnaire at the close of the event, the data revealed significant changes in opinion across all five policy areas. In particular, more extreme policy proposals lost support on both the left and the right in favor of more moderate proposals. Of the 26 policy proposals that generated the most dramatic partisan-based polarization among participants before attending America in One Room, post-event polling data showed the two parties moved closer on 22 of these, significantly so in 19 cases. (No such shift was evident among the control group who did not attend the event.)

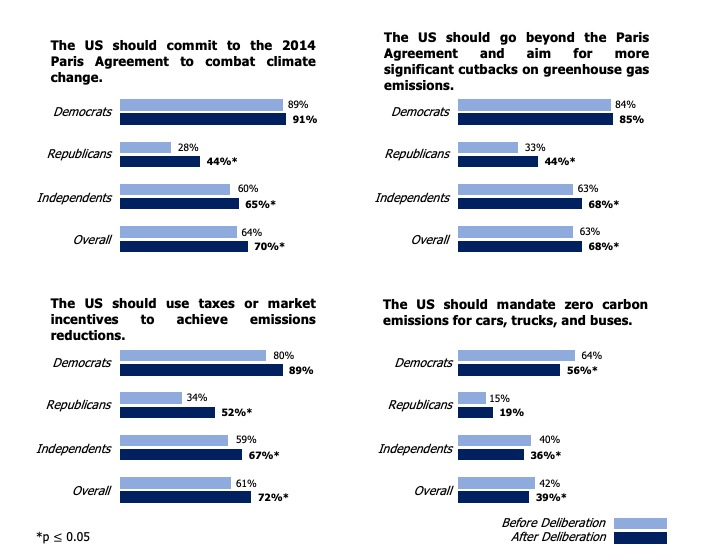
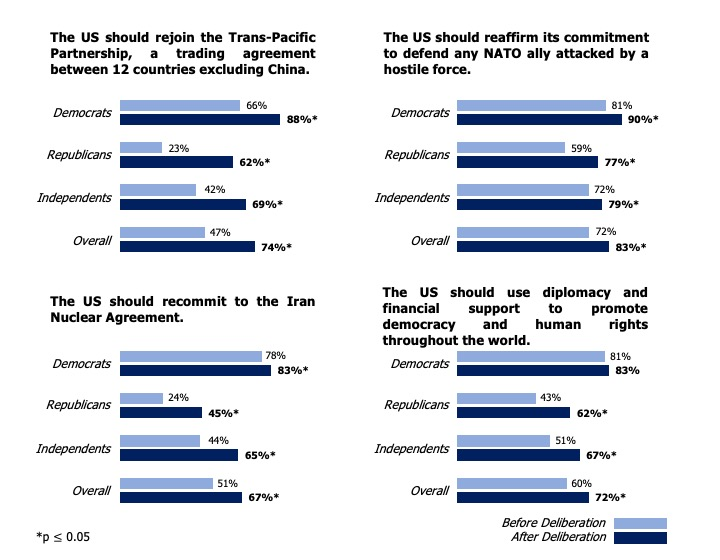
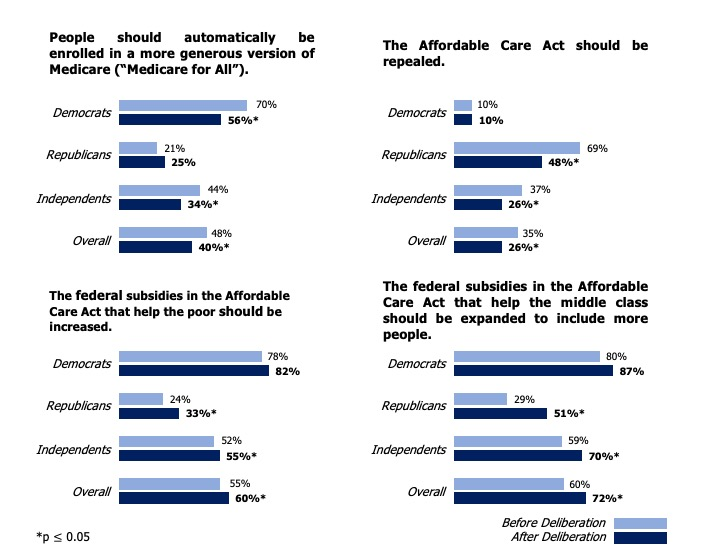
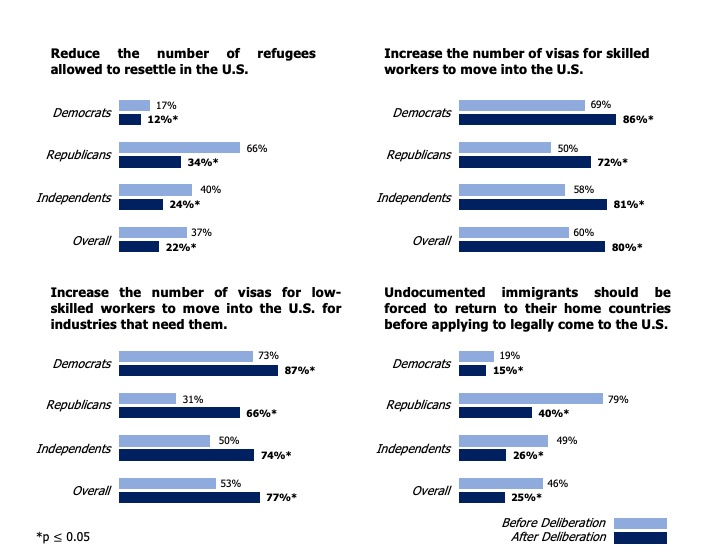
A sample of polling data before and after deliberation

The Southwest Times summarized a subset of these findings:

"Before the sessions began, 79% of Republicans supported forcibly deporting illegal immigrants to their countries of origin before they could apply to return. By the end, it was 40%. The percentage of Republicans favoring the Deferred Action for Childhood Arrivals program – which protects immigrants brought to America illegally as children – increased from 36% to 61%. Support for recommitting to the Iran nuclear deal increased from 24% to 45%, while support for rejoining the multi-country Trans-Pacific Partnership trade deal rose from 23% to 62%. Meanwhile, some Democrats moved away from the left or otherwise changed their opinion on some issues. Democratic support for requiring employers to use the E-verify system to confirm immigrant workers’ eligibility increased from 58.5% to 69%. Support for a $15 federal minimum wage dropped from 82.5% to 59.4%. Support for a baby bond proposal – given to you by the government when you're born so that you can redeem it when you turn 18 – dropped from 61% support to 21%. The percentage of Democrats who agreed that “Medicare for all” would increase the national debt to “impossible levels” rose from 20% to 38.5%."

Moreover, participants viewed members of opposing political parties more favorably after participating in America in One Room, with Democrats reporting a 13-point increase in positive feelings towards Republicans and Republicans’ favorable opinion of Democrats rising by almost 14 points. 54% of participants agreed that people who held differing political opinions from their own had “good reasons” for doing so (up from 34% before deliberation).

Fishkin has said that the deliberative polling methodology was not developed to drive depolarization, though it has turned out to be a statistically significant byproduct of the process. According to Fishkin, “If you have a moderated discussion with diverse others, you open up to people from different socio-economic backgrounds and different points of view, you learn to listen to them, as well as speak to them. If these discussions are in-depth enough, people will depolarize.”

== Media and reception ==
America in One Room was covered by both right and left-leaning media outlets, including The New York Times, FiveThirtyEight, the BBC, The National Interest, Christian Science Monitor, Axios, Forbes, and Vanity Fair. Writing for Salon , journalist Paul Rosenberg observed:

"Just as Donald Trump's fears of impeachment were leading him to tweet threats about ‘civil war,’ a real-life microcosm of the American electorate that gathered just outside Dallas … has produced a diametrically opposite picture of highly functional civic dialogue."

President Barack Obama called the event "a reminder that behind every opinion lies a human being with real experiences and a story to tell."

Fareed Zakaria referenced America in One Room while reporting on the 2020 Democratic National Convention, saying:

"If the Democrats continue to embrace this kind of deliberative democracy, they will have an opportunity to make policy changes that endure, and perhaps more importantly, to heal this country's broken democratic culture."

America in One Room received a Fast Company World Changing Ideas honorable mention and was the subject of an eight-part Snapchat documentary series. Voices of America in One Room, a podcast featuring the stories of those who attended the event, premiered in March 2021.

The event was dramatized in a play under the same name by playwright Jason Odell Williams. The play premiered at the Florida Studio Theatre in 2021.

== Follow-up studies ==
The Center for Deliberative Democracy and NORC conducted a follow-up study with America in One Room's citizen delegates one year later, on the cusp of the 2020 presidential elections. 463 of 523 original participants took part in the survey. The results indicated that long-term shifts in delegates’ political views had occurred.

In comparison to members of the control group, citizen delegates reported paying more attention to the presidential campaign and disapproved more strongly of the government's coronavirus response. In addition, delegates were 15 percentage points more likely to support Joe Biden in the election than control group survey participants. This advantage increased to 25 percentage points among voters who self-identified as moderate or independent.

The New York Times reported on the study on October 24, 2020, noting “few events -- including the president's impeachment and the pandemic -- have moved public opinion anywhere near that much.”

In July 2021, Fishkin and Diamond co-authored a research paper with Alice Siu of the Center for Deliberative Democracy and Norman Bradburn of NORC that was published in the American Political Science Review. Their research was based on data from America in One Room that established the statistically significant effects deliberation had on driving depolarization.
