= Christopher Frey =

German writer (born 1959)

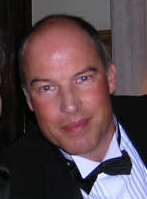

Christopher Frey (German: [fʁaɪ]; born 1959, Bonn, West Germany) is a German writer. He grew up in a political and international environment as his father worked for the US embassy. He received a music education at the school of music of the Regensburger Domspatzen. His early interest in the fine arts was also triggered by his family background of four generations of historians. His grandfather, a lawyer and undersecretary, published beside of many works about music theory and undiscovered works of Giovanni Pierluigi da Palestrina also the translation of the poetry of Michelangelo which his great-grandfather Carl Frey (1857–1917) once had started.

Frey's first publications date back to the seventies. ‘Soon or Sooner’, published in 1976, was a volume of poetry on three different life styles of people in the past, today and the future. In a letter to Christopher Frey, the East German author Christa Wolf stated ‘not yet matured’ about the young author. A theatre piece ‘The death of Empedokles in the hardening shop’ followed in 1978. Both titles are today only available through antiquarian book shops.

Christopher Frey's latest books contain a broad view upon commercial ethics and innovation. He is a change agent for a knowledge economy and Catallaxy. Books available in English are ‘Inventing Future’ (2007), an essay on Social Change and the essay ‘Just too Lazy to Lie’ which is meant as an answer to Harry G. Frankfurt’s bestseller ‘On Bullshit’. Two short publications titled 'Lottocracy' and 'Financial Crisis' followed in 2009. In 2010 the novel 'The Market is a Conversation' is probably the most fascinating 'oevre' of Frey in recent years. His complete opus is documented on The German National Library.

Christopher Frey lives as author and business angel in Hamilton, Bermuda.
