= World Wide Views on Global Warming =

World Wide Views on Global Warming: A global project initiated by The Danish Board of Technology on the occasion of the United Nations Climate Change Conference (COP15) held in Copenhagen December 2009.

World Wide Views on Global Warming (or just WWViews) was an international citizens involvement project based on methods developed by The Danish Board of Technology for the purpose of involving citizens in the political decision-making processes.

== The WWViews method ==
The World Wide Views project meetings were carried through on September 26, 2009 simultaneously in all the participating countries and on this day the citizens debated the same topics issued at the actual December 2009 United Nations Climate Change Conference. On the basis of an informed and structured dialogue and expert presentations the citizens – 100 in each country – made up their minds about a range of questions and dilemmas concerning different aspects of the climate debate. The results were uploaded throughout the day and are publicly available on the projects website (se link below). Some answers are quantifiable, permitting statistical comparison, but contrary to regular surveys the methods used for WWViews also gave the participants the option of discussing questions externally and further qualifying the answers.

World Wide Views on Global Warming gave citizens across the globe the possibility of influencing political decisions in regard to Earth’s climate, because the meetings presented citizens with the opportunity to express how far they were willing to let politicians go in the struggle to reduce CO_{2} emission.

== The WWViews partners ==
More than 4000 citizens representing 38 countries across the world joined the World Wide Views on Global Warming, who take a significant role in expanding the growth of the WWViews project. The roles of the partners is to hold national and regional meetings on behalf of the WWviews. Without the help of these partners from around the world, WWViews would not succeed.

== WWViews on biodiversity ==
Leading up to the Convention on Biological Diversity Conference of the Parties (COP 11) meeting on biodiversity in India 2012, 34 citizen meetings in 25 countries across the world was held on September 15, 2012, involving 42 old and new partners and building on the experiences from the World Wide View on Global Warming as part of the newest World Wide Views project, World Wide Views on Biodiversity.

Learn more about the project on the official homepage.
