= Danish Board of Technology =

Danish not-for-profit organization

Coordinates: 55.6803°N 12.5814°E

The Danish Board of Technology Foundation is engaged in tasks and making contributions to public challenges calling for technology, knowledge, values and actions to be taken in all spheres of society. They work in such areas as IT, genetic engineering, energy, environmental issues, biotechnology, health and transportation.

The DBT Foundation continues the efforts of its predecessor, the Danish Board of Technology – an independent counseling institution connected to the Danish Ministry of Science, Innovation and Higher Education. The DBT Foundation will build on the work undertaken by the Board.

The DBT Foundation advises decision-makers about possibilities and consequences for citizens, environment and society. The DBT Foundation also acts as an international role model in developing dialogue based working methods. The DBT Foundation uses their methods and skills in many areas.

== Methods ==
The DBT works in the area between public challenges, technology, knowledge, values and actions to be taken. They create platforms for participants to pool their knowledge, finding sustainable and interdisciplinary solutions. They combine their knowledge about public and social conditions with their experience about processes.

The DBT assume different roles depending on the way they are involved in projects. They often create an overview and knowledge about a certain problem. This can happen by creating new ideas for development of politics, planning and strategy to decide lifelong and sustainable planning and strategies. The DBT often involve citizens, politicians, experts and stakeholders.

The DBT has a wide range of methods and knowledge in many areas concerning technology. They take part in developing analysis, statements and assessments on technology topics and works on processes leading to new ways of thinking and common solutions. The DBT are experienced in developing and organizing of citizens’ participation with more than 1000 citizens. A natural extension of this expertise has led to them having courses and speeches about citizen participation and stakeholder involvement, and national and international workshops and conferences.

The DBT Foundation arranges and completes projects in cooperation with e.g. decision takers, organizations, associations, companies and authorities. The Foundation is non-profit as profit of the activities is used for non-profit purposes.

== Projects ==
The DBT are experienced in different topics concerning the possibilities and consequences that technology has on people, environment and society. The following projects are just some of themes The DBT are involved in.

World Wide Views. The DBT carried out a global citizen involvement projects in 2009 called World Wide Views on Global Warming. 4000 citizens discussed global warming issues in 38 countries all over the world the same day. The results were presented at COP15 in Copenhagen in December 2009. The DBT continued the concept in 2012 with World Wide Views on Biodiversity. 3000 citizens in 25 countries discussed the challenges on biodiversity. These results were presented at COP11 in India in October 2012.

Test yourself. The aim of the project was to create an overview on the supply of self-tests and discuss how different products or product groups continues to be handled by the health care system to benefit individual citizens and society as much as possible. The project ended in 2011.

BASE. The project started in 2013 and focuses on the key issues of climate adaptation strategies. The project will simultaneously examine the general policy at the EU and national level and actual activities at local and regional levels.

DESSI. The DESSI project will provide a decision support system to end users of security investments. The system will give insight into the pros and cons of specific security investments. The project is ongoing and will end in 2013.

Obesity as problem for society. The project aimed at creating an overview on the political tasks in preventing obesity in Denmark. The project ended in 2012.

A citizen consultation on the regional development in Region Nordjylland. 200 citizens gathered to discuss the future for Region Nordjylland in September 2011. The citizen consultation was held in Region Nordjylland in cooperation with The DBT.

Information Communication Technology (ICT). The DBT has had a number of workgroups on how ICT impacts and change the society and what the parliament and politicians should be advised to do. Thorough detail here DBT ICT Projects.

Read more about DBT’s projects here.

== See also ==
- World wide views, public opinion project

== The structure and history of DBT ==
The DBT consists of a board with seven members, representatives under new formation and a secretariat with 25 employees.

The DBT was abolished by law in November 2011. The DBT Foundation was established as a non-profit foundation on June 20, 2012.

The DBT received an annual subsidy and paid annual report to the Parliamentary Committee on Science and Technology.

The DBT board consisted of 11 members. 4 was appointed by the minister of Science and the others was appointed by nomination from a number of organizations.

The DBT had the statuary duty to inform citizens and politicians on new technology. They had a magazine called Teknologidebat (Technology debate) and two newsletters called Fra Rådet til Tinget (From the Board to the Parliament) and TeknoNyt (Techno-news).
