= Political egalitarianism =

When everyone has equal political power or influence

Egalitarian symbol Ⓔ

Political egalitarianism describes an inclusive and fair allocation of political power or inhifair processes, and fair treatment of all regardless of characteristics like race, gender, religion, age, wealth, intelligence and sexuality. Political egalitarianism, and its close cousin political equality, are key founding principles and sources of legitimacy for many democracies. Related principles include one person, one vote and equality before the law.

== Discussion ==
=== Egalitarianism ===
Egalitarianism denotes the belief that all people are of equal fundamental worth and should have equal status. Egalitarians tend to focus more on process and treating people as social equals than on the raw distribution of power.

=== Political equality ===
Political equality is only achieved when the norms, rules and procedures that govern the community afford equal consideration to all. The concept is cited in many definitions of democracy and touted as one of its advantages over oligarchy and autocracy. Alexander Guerrero argues that systems using sortition score better on political equality than electoral representative democracies. Robert Dahl believes that the ideal of democracy assumes that political equality is desirable. He goes on to argue that political equality and democracy are supported by the inherent intrinsic equal worth of every person (intrinsic equality) and the tendency of concentrated power to corrupt.

=== Equality before the law ===
Equality before law means that the law applies to all peoples equally and without exceptions. For example, the freedom of speech should apply the same to all members of a society. Laws can sometimes be designed to help minimize unequal application. Well-designed constitutions, for example, can help protect political rights in functioning democracies.

== See also ==
- "All men are created equal"
- Deliberative democracy
- Democratization
- Human rights
- Money in politics
- Political freedom
- Positive liberty
- Universal suffrage
