= Steven Kull =

Dr. Steven Kull is a political psychologist who studies the impact of public opinion on public policy. He has conducted polls and focus groups in over 30 countries around the world. He has led in-depth studies in the United States and the Muslim world, as well as numerous large multi-nation studies of world public opinion. Kull appears regularly in international media and has testified to or consulted with the U.S. Congress, the U.S. State Department, the United Nations, NATO, the European Commission, and other agencies.

Kull is director of the Program for Public Consultation (PPC), part of the School of Public Policy at the University of Maryland. PPC was established to develop the methods and theory of public consultation and to conduct public consultations. In particular it will work with government agencies to help them consult their citizens on key public policy issues that the government faces. The Program for Public Consultation, in conjunction with the School of Public Policy at the University of Maryland, is committed to developing and refining methods of public consultation and applying those methods, especially in direct collaboration with government agencies.

Kull is also Founder and President of Voice of the People (VOP), a nonpartisan organization that seeks to re-anchor the United States' democracy in its founding principles by giving ‘We the People’ a greater role in government. VOP furthers the use of innovative methods and technology to give the American people a more effective voice in the policymaking process. VOP works with the Program for Public Consultation to develop policymaking simulations to enable individual citizens to get informed on key issues before government, to hear arguments and offer their recommendations to their Congressional representatives.

Kull also oversees the WorldPublicOpinion.org project, a collaborative project of research centers in over 25 countries that conduct international polls.

Kull is licensed as a clinical psychologist and practiced as a psychotherapist for over 10 years. He was associated with the method psychosynthesis, having been trained by its founder Roberto Assagioli at the Istituto di Psicosintest in Florence.

Kull graduated from the University of California in 1972 with a B.A. in Psychology and from the Saybrook Institute in 1980 with a Ph.D. in psychology. From 1984 to 1988 he was a post-doctoral fellow at Stanford University, studying international relations under the tutelage of Alexander George.

== Bibliography ==
- Minds at War: Nuclear Reality and the Inner Conflicts of Defense Policymakers (Basic, 1988)
  Kull's first book was based on interviews he conducted with U.S. defense policymakers.
- Burying Lenin: The Revolution in Soviet Ideology and Foreign Policy (Westview, 1992; ISBN 9780813315010)
  Kull's second book was based on interviews he conducted in the Soviet Union.
- Misreading the Public: the Myth of a New Isolationism (Brookings, 1998; ISBN 9780815791386)
  Co-authored with I.M. Destler, Kull took the lead in a major study that revealed that members of the American policy community had a greatly exaggerated perception of the degree of isolationism in the American public.
- Feeling Betrayed: The Roots of Muslim Anger at America (2011, Brookings Institution Press; ISBN 9780815705598)
  An analysis of how Muslims see America based on focus groups conducted in Egypt, Morocco, Pakistan, Jordan, Iran, and Indonesia; and in-depth surveys in eleven majority-Muslim nations over several years.
