= Deliberative opinion poll =

Gauges opinion before and after significant deliberation

A deliberative opinion poll, sometimes called a deliberative poll, is a form of opinion poll taken before and after significant deliberation. Political scientist James S. Fishkin of Stanford University first described the concept in 1988. The typical deliberative opinion poll takes a random, representative sample of citizens and engages them in deliberation on current issues or proposed policy changes through small-group discussions and conversations with competing experts to create more informed and reflective public opinion. Deliberative polls have been run around the world, including recent experiments to conduct discussions virtually in the United States, Hong Kong, Chile, Canada and Japan.

== Process ==
The Deliberative Democracy Lab at Stanford University described its process as:

1. A random, representative sample is first polled on the issue(s)
2. Members of the sample are invited to gather in order to discuss the issue(s) (online or in-person)
3. Carefully balanced briefing materials are sent to the participants and are also made publicly available (along with other aspects of the deliberations).
4. The participants talk to competing experts and political leaders, asking questions they develop in small group discussions with trained moderators.
5. The sample is again polled (with a private questionnaire) on the original questions. The resulting changes in opinion represent the conclusions the public would likely reach, if they had opportunity to participate in the deliberative process. By measuring both before and after judgments, policymakers and the media have more insight into the process and its impacts on participants.

Fishkin argues that during deliberation, discussions should strive for political equality, where everyone's voice is given equal consideration. This can be achieved through discussions that:

- are backed by reasonably truthful claims,
- give space for arguments both for and against the proposal,
- remain polite and listen to others,
- focus on the merit of the arguments, and
- cover a diverse array of perspectives from substantial portions of the population.

Logistically, deliberative opinion polls are very similar to other deliberative gatherings like citizens' assemblies. A couple areas where deliberative polling might differ is that a deliberative poll always has 100 to 200 participants, to ensure a statistically significant sample. In addition, deliberative polling emphasizes measuring opinion change after receiving new information and discussion rather than finding common areas of agreement or concrete policy proposals. The goal is to allow the researcher to get a reliable estimate of citizens' preferences both as-is and after an extensive process of deliberation about an issue. Experiments in online polling using an AI moderator have led study authors to conclude that the AI model tested was as effective as human moderators according to participant evaluations, allowing polls to be conducted more often at a reduced cost. While in-person deliberations should pay for childcare, venues, moderators, hotels, and stipends to achieve a representative sample, online deliberations seem to only need to offer increased bandwidth, technical support, newer devices and a smaller stipend to participants.

== Examples ==
=== Online ===
In 2019, the Deliberative Democracy Lab and the Helena Group launched America in One Room, a deliberative poll of a representative sample of 526 Americans on various issues. Polling results found that in general voters seemed to move towards the center after their experience, with an effect lasting at least one year after the in-person gathering. Subsequent deliberative polls have been conducted online in groups of 10 using an AI moderator.

=== In person ===
In the mid-to-late 2000s, Fishkin's team selected a representative sample of the Chinese coastal township of Zeguo (pop. 120,000) in Wenling. Deliberative polling took place over a one- to three-day period after which recommendations were implemented. Most accounts found the pilot successful, leading to an expanded scope beyond public works projects to a process that determined the budget each year.

Between 1996 and 1998, Fishkin managed deliberative opinion polls for electric utilities in Texas as part of the state's integrated resource planning process. The participants underwent a significant shift in the percentage who agreed that it was worth higher costs to invest in energy efficiency and renewable resources. Those findings led to a higher renewable energy portfolio standard, shifting the utilities' focus toward energy efficiency and renewables, resulting in a relatively high percentage of wind power compared to other states.

== Impacts ==
=== On decision-makers ===
Deliberative polling can serve as important input mechanisms upstream in the policy making process. Fishkin does not advocate using deliberative polls for every public concern. For instance, crisis measures that demand instant decisions may not be appropriate. However, he advocates using it for most tasks, which could include the hiring of crisis managers.

Some, like Lafont, see voting where everyone can participate as more legitimate than random selection of decision-makers. Fishkin believes that once most skeptics experience a well-run deliberative process that they would find it more legitimate than elections. Both believe that legitimacy is improved if the public can see all the inputs (including briefing materials) that led to the decision, so that others can be included in the reasoning for and against to know whether their views were given a fair hearing. As both group dynamics and personalities of participants can play an important role in producing different outcomes of discussions, implementation is important for successful, legitimate deliberation.

=== On participants ===
Participants can come to learn and appreciate the circumstances and interests of competing arguments through extended discussions and deliberations. This can be achieved by:

1. randomly assigning participants into small groups and
2. having impartial moderators to ensure all the major arguments for and against major policy options are covered.

While participants become more engaged and knowledgeable, thoughtful conclusions are expected to emerge, leading to a better quality of public opinion. Fishkin has found that if people think their voice actually matters in the question at hand, then they'll study the material, ask tough questions and think for themselves with about 70% changing their minds in the process. Furthermore, it is also hoped that such poll can help increase deliberation among all members of the public. This led Fishkin and Yale Law Professor Bruce Ackerman to propose a national holiday called Deliberation Day to allow voters to gather in large and small groups to discuss political issues.

== See also ==
- Deliberative assembly
- Deliberative democracy
- Deliberative referendum
- Habermas machine
- Pol.is
- Sortition
