= The Good Society =

- Discipline: Political science, economics
- Language: English
- Edited by: Joshua A. Miller

Publication details
- Former name(s): The Newsletter of PEGS
- History: 1991-present
- Publisher: Penn State University Press (United States)
- Frequency: Biannually

Standard abbreviations
- ISO 4: Good Soc.

Indexing
- ISSN: 1089-0017 (print); 1538-9731 (web)
- JSTOR: 10890017
- OCLC no.: 49210134

Links
- Journal homepage; Online access

The Good Society is an academic journal. It is published twice a year by the Penn State University Press on behalf of The Committee for the Political Economy of the Good Society (PEGS). Between 1991 and 1995, the journal went by the name The Newsletter of PEGS.
