= Sortition =

Selection of decision-makers by random sample

In governance, sortition is the selection of public officials or jurors at random, i.e., by lottery, in order to obtain a representative sample.

In ancient Athenian democracy, sortition was the traditional and primary method for appointing political officials, and its use was regarded as a principal characteristic of democracy. Sortition is often classified as a method for both direct democracy and deliberative democracy.

Today, sortition is commonly used to select prospective jurors in common-law systems. What has changed in recent years is the increased number of citizen groups with political advisory power, along with calls for making sortition more consequential than elections, as it was in Athens, Venice, and Florence.

== History ==
=== Ancient Athens ===
Athenian democracy developed in the 6th century BC out of what was then called isonomia (equality of law and political rights). Sortition was then the principal way of achieving this fairness. It was utilized to pick most of the magistrates for their governing committees, and for their juries (typically of 501 men).

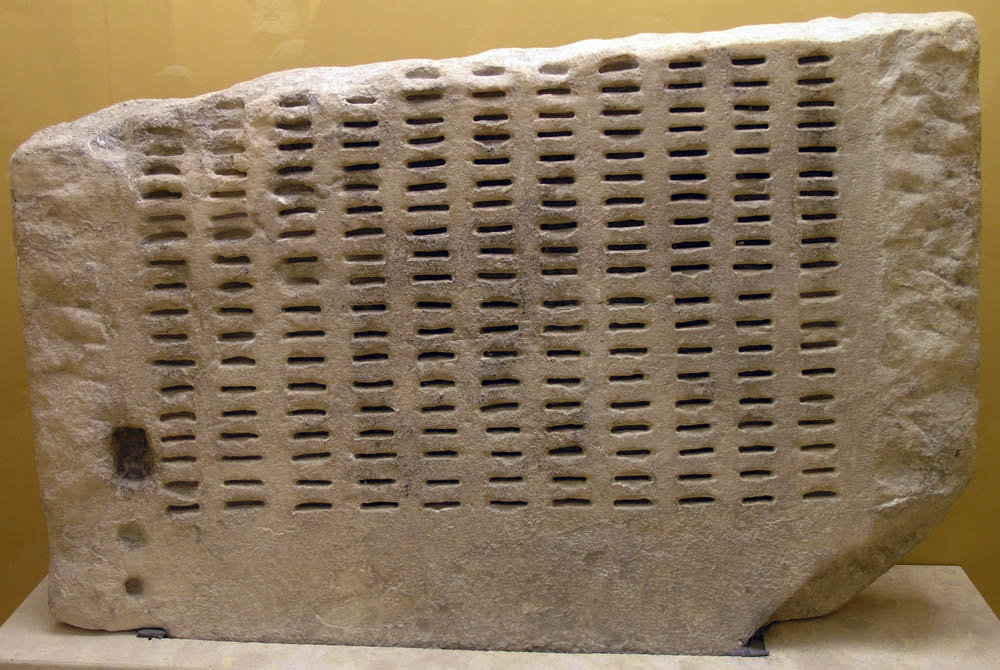
A kleroterion in the Ancient Agora Museum (Athens)

Most Athenians believed sortition, not elections, to be democratic and used complex procedures with purpose-built allotment machines (kleroteria) to avoid the corrupt practices used by oligarchs to buy their way into office. According to the author Mogens Herman Hansen, the citizen's court was superior to the assembly because the allotted members swore an oath which ordinary citizens in the assembly did not; therefore, the court could annul the decisions of the assembly. Most Greek writers who mention democracy (including Aristotle, (Note: Aristotle, Politics 1301a28-35) (Note: Aristotle, Politics 4.1294be) Plato, (Note: Plato, Republic VIII, 557a) Herodotus, (Note: Herodotus The Histories 3.80.6) and Pericles (Note: Thucydides, The Peloponnesian War. The Funeral Oration of Pericles.)) emphasize the role of selection by lot, or state outright that being allotted is more democratic than elections (which were seen as oligarchic). Socrates (Note: Xenophon. Memorabilia Book I, 2.9) and Isocrates (Note: Isocrates. Areopagiticus (section 23)) however questioned whether randomly-selected decision-makers had enough expertise.

Past scholarship maintained that sortition had roots in the use of chance to divine the will of the gods, but this view is no longer common among scholars. In Ancient Greek mythology, Zeus, Poseidon, and Hades used sortition to determine who ruled over which domain. Zeus got the sky, Poseidon the sea, and Hades the underworld.

In Athenian democracy, to be eligible to be chosen by lot, citizens self-selected into the available pool, then onto lotteries in the kleroteria machines. The magistracies assigned by lot generally had terms of service of one year. A citizen could not hold any particular magistracy more than once in his lifetime, but could hold other magistracies. All male citizens over 30 years of age, who were not disenfranchised by atimia, were eligible. Those selected through lot underwent examination called dokimasia to ensure citizenship and consider life, character, and at times, property; capacity for a post was assumed. Rarely were selected citizens discarded. Magistrates, once in place, were subjected to constant monitoring by the Assembly. Each magistrate appointed by lot was required, upon completion of his term, to render an account of his time in office, called a euthyna. Any citizen could request the suspension of a magistrate with due reason.

A Kleroterion was used to allot officers and select eligible and willing citizens to serve jury duty. This bolstered the initial Athenian system of democracy by getting new and different jury members from each tribe to avoid corruption. James Wycliffe Headlam wrote that the Athenian Council, which consisted of 500 randomly selected male citizens, would commit occasional mistakes such as levying taxes that were too high. Headlam wrote that power did not tend to go to those who sought it, and deemed systematic oppression and organized fraud impossible due to widely and randomly distributed power combined with checks and balances. He stated that the Athenians largely trusted the system of random selection, regarding it as the most natural and the simplest way of appointment. Sortition was used for most positions, except for military positions such as strategos that were elected.

=== Lombardy and Venice – 12th to 18th century ===
The brevia was used in the city states of Lombardy during the 12th and 13th centuries and in Venice until the late 18th century. Men, who were chosen randomly, swore an oath that they were not acting under bribes, and then they elected members of the council. Voter and candidate eligibility probably included property owners, councilors, guild members, and perhaps, at times, artisans. The Doge of Venice was determined through a complex process of nomination, voting and sortition.

Lot was used in the Venetian system only in order to select members of the committees that served to nominate candidates for the Great Council. A combination of election and lot was used in this multi-stage process. Lot was not used alone to select magistrates, unlike in Florence and Athens. The use of lot to select nominators made it more difficult for political sects to exert power, and discouraged campaigning. By reducing intrigue and power moves within the Great Council, lot maintained cohesiveness among the Venetian nobility, contributing to the stability of this republic. Top magistracies generally still remained in the control of elite families.

=== Florence – 14th and 15th century ===
Scrutiny was used in Florence for over a century starting in 1328. Nominations and voting together created a pool of candidates from different sectors of the city. The names of these men were deposited into a sack, and a lottery draw determined who would get to be a magistrate. The scrutiny was gradually opened up to minor guilds, reaching the greatest level of Renaissance citizen participation in 1378–1382.

In Florence, lot was used to select magistrates and members of the Signoria during republican periods. Florence utilized a combination of lot and scrutiny by the people, set forth by the ordinances of 1328. In 1494, Florence founded a Great Council in the model of Venice. The nominatori were thereafter chosen by lot from among the members of the Great Council, indicating an increase in aristocratic power.

=== The Enlightenment ===
During the Age of Enlightenment, many of the political ideals originally championed by the democratic city-states of ancient Greece were revisited. The use of sortition as a means of selecting the members of government while receiving praise from notable Enlightenment thinkers, received almost no discussion during the formation of the American and French republics.

Montesquieu's book The Spirit of Laws provides one of the most cited discussions of the concept in Enlightenment political writing. Montesquieu argues that sortition is natural to democracy, just as elections are to aristocracy. He echoes the philosophy of much earlier thinkers such as Aristotle, who found elections as aristocratic. Montesquieu caveats his support by saying that there should also be some mechanisms to ensure the pool of selection is competent and not corrupt. Rousseau also found that a mixed model of sortition and election provided a healthier path for democracy than one or the other. Harrington, also found the Venetian model of sortition compelling, recommending it for his ideal republic of Oceana. Edmund Burke, in contrast, worried that those randomly selected to serve would be less effective and productive than self-selected politicians. (Note: Edmund Burke (1790), Reflections on the Revolution in France)

Bernard Manin, a French political theorist, was astonished to find so little consideration of sortition in the early years of representative government. He wonders if perhaps the choosing of rulers by lot may have been viewed as impractical on such a large scale as the modern state, or if elections were thought to give greater political consent than sortition.

However, David Van Reybrouck disagrees with Manin's theories on the lack of consideration of sortition. He suggests that the relatively limited knowledge about Athenian democracy played a major role, with the first thorough examination coming only in 1891 with Election by Lot at Athens. He also argues that wealthy enlightenment figures preferred to retain more power by holding elections, with most not even offering excuses on the basis of practicality but plainly saying they preferred to retain significant elite power, citing commentators of 18th century France and the United States suggesting that they simply dislodged a hereditary aristocracy to replace it with an elected aristocracy.

=== Switzerland ===
Because financial gain could be achieved through the position of mayor, some parts of Switzerland used random selection during the years between 1640 and 1837 to prevent corruption.

== Methods ==
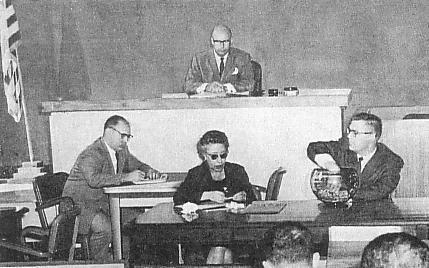
USCAR Court select juries by sortition.

Before the random selection can be done, the pool of candidates must be defined. Systems vary as to whether they allot from eligible volunteers, from those screened by education, experience, or a passing grade on a test, or screened by election by those selected by a previous round of random selection, or from the membership or population at large. A multi-stage process in which random selection is alternated with other screening methods can be used, as in the Venetian system.

David Chaum proposed selecting a random sample of eligible voters to study and vote on a public policy, while Deliberative opinion polling invites a random sample to deliberate together before voting on a policy.

== Analysis ==
=== Outcomes ===
Andranik Tangian critiques electoral politics as over-representing politically active people and groups in a society. Cognitive diversity (or wisdom of the crowd) utilizes a variety of perspectives and cognitive skills to find better solutions. According to numerous scholars such as Page and Landemore, this diversity is more important to creating successful ideas than the average ability level of a group. Page argues that random selection of persons of average intelligence perform better than a collection of the best individual problem solvers. This "diversity trumps ability theorem" is central to the arguments for sortition.

=== Efficiency ===
Some argue that randomly-allocating decision-making is more efficient than representative democracy through elections. John Burnheim critiques representative democracy as requiring citizens to vote for a large package of policies and preferences bundled together in one representative or party, much of which a voter might not want. He argues that this does not translate voter preferences as well as sortition, where a group of people have the time and the ability to focus on a single issue. By allowing decision-makers to focus on positive-sum endeavors rather than zero-sum elections, it could help to lessen political polarization and the influence of money and interest-groups in politics. Some studies show an overrepresentation of psychopathic and narcissistic traits in elected officials, which can be solved through sortition by not selecting for people who seek power.

=== Participation ===
Burnheim also notes the importance of legitimacy for the effectiveness of the practice. Legitimacy does depend on the success in achieving representativeness, which if not met, could limit the use cases of sortition to serving as consultative or political agenda-setting bodies. Oliver Dowlen points to the egalitarian nature of all citizens having an equal chance of entering office irrespective of any bias in society that appear in representative bodies that can make them more representative. To bolster legitimacy, other sortition bodies have been used and proposed to set the rules to improve accountability without the need for elections. The introduction of a variable percentage of randomly selected independent legislators in a Parliament can increase the global efficiency of a legislature, in terms of both number of laws passed and average social welfare obtained (this work is consistent with a 2010 paper on how the adoption of random strategies can improve the efficiency of hierarchical organizations).

As participants grow in competence by contributing to deliberation, they also become more engaged and interested in civic affairs. Most societies have some type of citizenship education, but sortition-based committees allow ordinary people to develop their own democratic capacities through direct participation. Survey experiments have produced mixed results, finding that the perceived legitimacy of sortition depends on factors like individual characteristics and the policy issue in question.

== Modern application ==
Sortition is most commonly used to form deliberative mini-publics like citizens' assemblies (or the smaller citizen juries). The OECD has counted almost 600 examples of citizens' assemblies with members selected by lottery for public decision making.

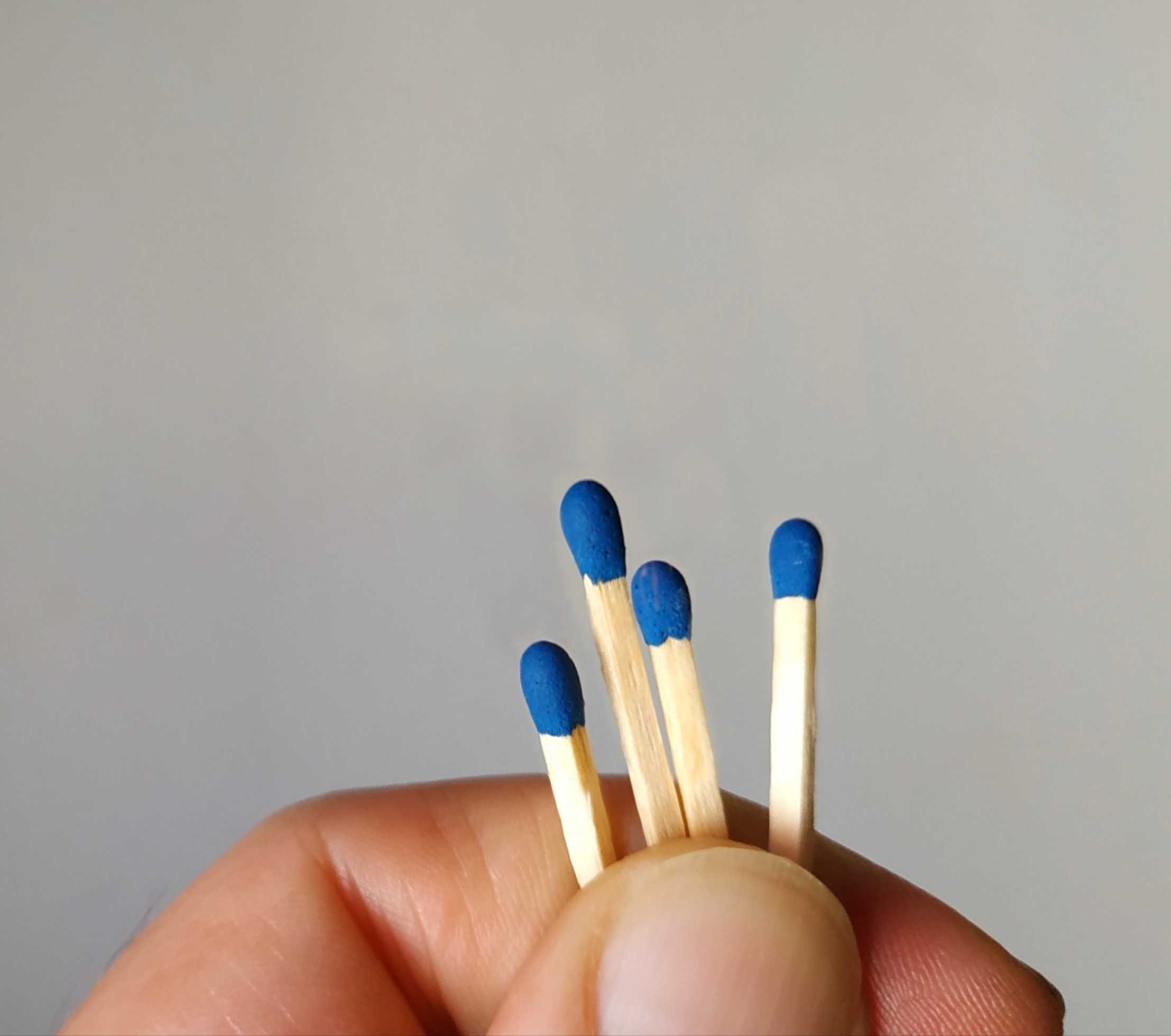
Drawing straws within a small group: one of four matches is broken to be shorter than the others, and the four are presented to the group to draw from, the chooser of the short match being selected

Sortition is commonly used in selecting juries in Anglo-Saxon legal systems and in small groups (e.g., picking a school class monitor by drawing straws). In public decision-making, individuals are often determined by allotment if other forms of selection such as election fail to achieve a result. Examples include certain hung elections and certain votes in the UK Parliament. Some contemporary thinkers like David Van Reybrouck have advocated a greater use of selection by lot in today's political systems.

Sortition is also used in military conscription, as one method of awarding US green cards, and in placing students into some schools, university classes, and university residences.

=== Within organizations ===
Sortition also has potential for helping large associations to govern themselves democratically without the use of elections. Co-ops, employee-owned businesses, housing associations, Internet platforms, student governments, and other large membership organizations whose members generally do not know many other members yet seek to run their organization democratically often find elections problematic. Examples include the Samaritan Ministries Health Plan using a panel of 13 randomly selected members to resolve select disputes and the New Zealand Health Research council awarding funding at random to applicants considered equally qualified.

=== Public policy ===
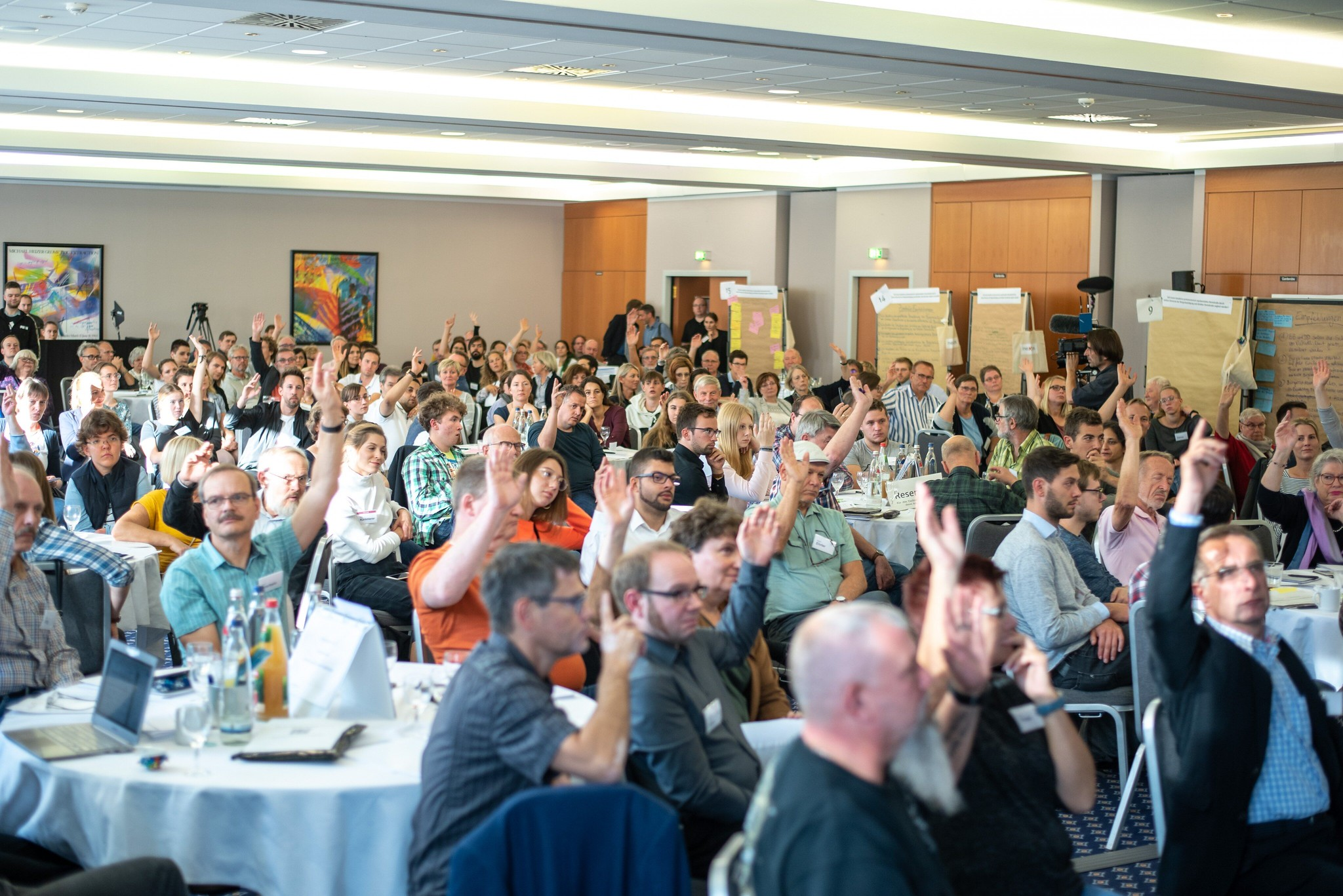
A session of a German citizens' assembly in 2019. The participants sit around tables for deliberation in small groups.

Citizens' assembly is a group of people selected by lottery from the general population to deliberate on important public questions so as to exert an influence. Other names and variations of deliberative mini-publics include citizens' jury, citizens' panel, people's panel, people's jury, policy jury, consensus conference and citizens' convention.

A citizens' assembly uses elements of a jury to create public policy. Its members form a representative cross-section of the public, and are provided with time, resources and a broad range of viewpoints to learn deeply about an issue. Through skilled facilitation, the assembly members weigh trade-offs and work to find common ground on a shared set of recommendations. Citizens' assemblies can be more representative and deliberative than public engagement, polls, legislatures or ballot initiatives. They seek quality of participation over quantity. They also have added advantages in issues where politicians have a conflict of interest, such as initiatives that will not show benefits before the next election or decisions that impact the types of income politicians can receive. They also are particularly well-suited to complex issues with trade-offs and values-driven dilemmas.

With Athenian democracy as the most famous government to use sortition, theorists and politicians have used citizens' assemblies and other forms of deliberative democracy in a variety of modern contexts. As of 2023, the international organization OECD has found their use increasing since 2010.

== Political proposals for sortition ==
=== Supplement legislatures ===
Political scientist Robert A. Dahl suggests that an advanced democratic state could form groups which he calls minipopuli. Each group would consist of perhaps a thousand citizens randomly selected, and would either set an agenda of issues or deal with a particular major issue. It would hold hearings, commission research, and engage in debate and discussion. Dahl suggests having the minipopuli as supplementing, rather than replacing, legislative bodies. Claudia Chwalisz has also advocated for using citizens' assemblies selected by sortition to inform policymaking on an ongoing basis.

==== Deliberative opinion poll ====
A deliberative opinion poll, sometimes called a deliberative poll, is a form of opinion poll taken before and after significant deliberation. Political scientist James S. Fishkin of Stanford University first described the concept in 1988. The typical deliberative opinion poll takes a random, representative sample of citizens and engages them in deliberation on current issues or proposed policy changes through small-group discussions and conversations with competing experts to create more informed and reflective public opinion. Deliberative polls have been run around the world, including recent experiments to conduct discussions virtually in the United States, Hong Kong, Chile, Canada and Japan.

=== Replace legislatures ===
John Burnheim envisioned a political system in which many small citizens' juries would deliberate and make decisions about public policies. His proposal included the dissolution of the state and of bureaucracies. The term demarchy was coined by Burnheim and is now sometimes used to refer to any political system in which sortition plays a central role. While Burnheim preferred using only volunteers, Christopher Frey uses the German term Lottokratie and recommends testing lottocracy in town councils. Lottocracy, according to Frey, will improve the direct involvement of each citizen and minimize the systematical errors caused by political parties in Europe. Influenced by Burnheim, Marxist economists Paul Cockshott and Allin Cottrell propose that, to avoid formation of a new social elite in a post-capitalist society, citizens' committees chosen by lot (or partially chosen by lot) should make major decisions.

Michael Donovan proposes that the percentage of voters who do not turnout have their representatives chosen by sortition. For example, with 60% voter turnout a number of legislators are randomly chosen to make up 40% of the overall parliament. A number of proposals for an entire legislative body to be chosen by sortition have been made for the United States, Canada, the United Kingdom, Denmark, and France.

Étienne Chouard advocates strongly that those seeking power (elected officials) should not write the rules, making sortition the best choice for creating constitutions and other rules around the allocation of power within a democracy. He and others propose replacing elections with bodies that use sortition to decide on key issues.

In 2013, Terry Bouricius proposed a model of “multi-body sortition” that divides legislative functions among several bodies, rather than assigning them to a single randomly selected legislature. He argues that different tasks call for groups of different sizes, selection methods, and lengths of service, making a single chamber ill-suited to perform every function. Separate bodies would set the agenda, review legislative proposals, decide whether to enact bills, and establish and oversee procedural rules. Volunteer interest panels could submit proposals, while final decisions would rest with large, randomly selected policy juries. Bouricius proposed that the model could supplement existing institutions or replace one or both elected legislative chambers.

=== Hire public officials ===
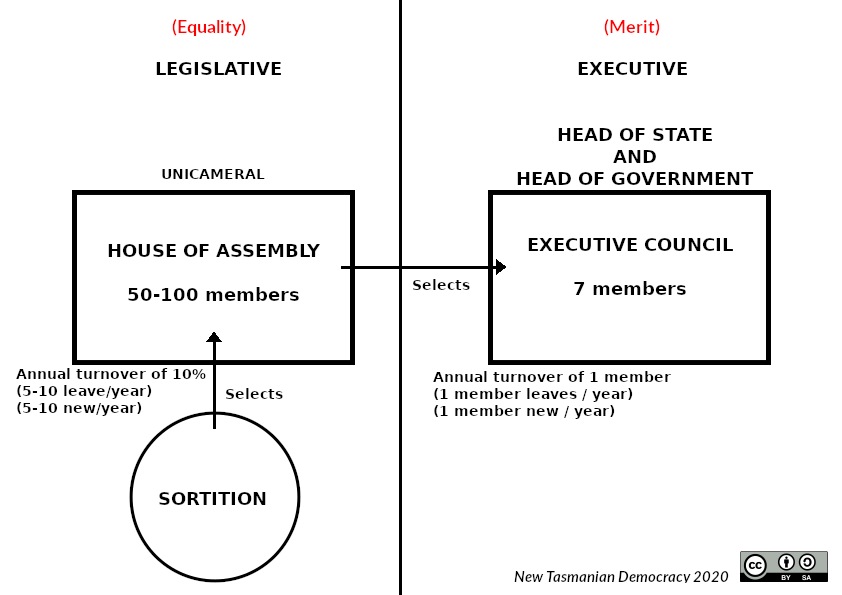
Proposed changes to the legislature of the Parliament of Tasmania: A single legislative body of 50–100 people is selected randomly from the population and makes laws. One of their duties is the selection of seven members of an executive council.

Simon Threlkeld proposed a wide range of public officials be chosen by randomly sampled juries, rather than by politicians or popular election.

=== Non-stratified sortition ===
T.L. Hulsey contends that stratification of the initial random pool to achieve demographic representation is a shibboleth. Groups are inevitably stratified to achieve a social justice objective – whether acknowledged or not – because the Law of Large Numbers cannot be applied to create a sortition assembly of workable size.

Hulsey points out that demographic stratification falsely assumes that narrow demographic self-interest spontaneously produces good policy; thus "representation" becomes a shibboleth that trumps our shared common humanity. For example, the Civil Rights Act of 1964 was enacted without black "representation" and Title VII of that law prohibiting employment discrimination against women (among others) passed although only 14 of the 535 members of Congress were women at the time. He quotes the disparagement of representation by A. Phillips Griffiths of the University of Warwick, who said "we should not allow lunatics to be represented by lunatics".

Hulsey's solution is to frankly admit that the formation of a workable initial pool is inescapably subjective; and that smaller populations (e.g., counties, cities, or neighborhoods) be allowed to establish any non-demographic criteria whatsoever, so that a few randomly chosen applicants who meet those criteria advance to form the larger assembly.

== See also ==
- Jury selection
- Political egalitarianism
- Presumptive inclusion
- Wisdom of the crowd
