= James S. Fishkin =

American political scientist and communications scholar

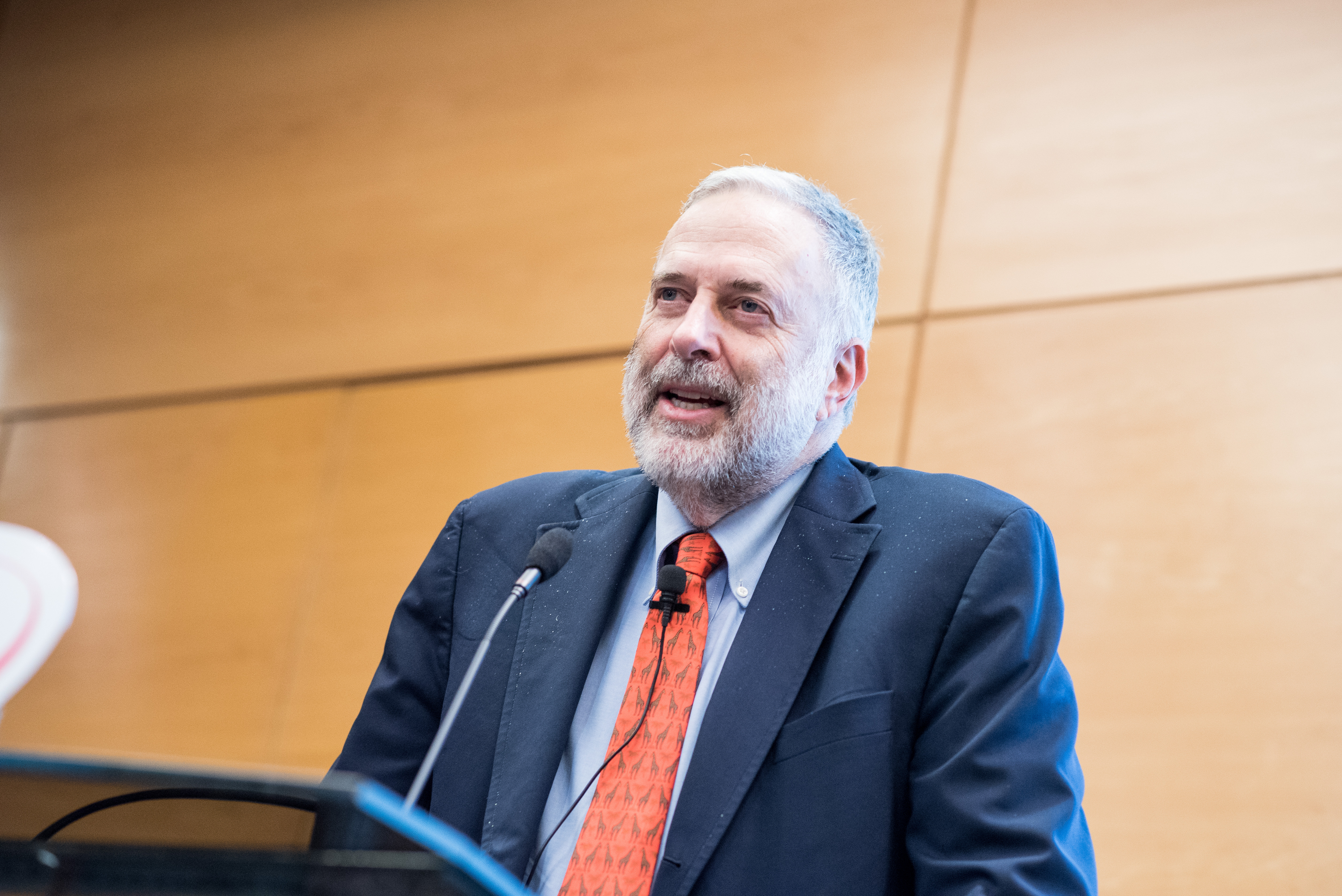
- Fishkin at the first edition of the Democracy 2050 conference, organized by the Tribu Foundation in Santiago de Chile in 2018
- Born: 1948 (age 77–78)
- Occupation: Political scientist
- Known for: Deliberative opinion poll

Academic background
- Education: Yale University (BA, PhD); Cambridge University (PhD)
- Doctoral advisor: Robert Dahl

James S. Fishkin (born 1948) is an American political scientist and communications scholar. He holds the Janet M. Peck Chair in International Communication in the Department of Communication at Stanford University, where he serves as a professor of communication and, by courtesy, political science. He also acts as the director of Stanford’s Deliberative Democracy Lab. Fishkin is widely cited for his work on deliberative democracy, with his proposition of Deliberative Polling in 1988 being particularly influential. Together with Robert Luskin, Fishkin's work has led to over 100 deliberative polls in 28 countries.

== Career ==
Fishkin earned his BA and Ph.D. in political science from Yale University, and his second Ph.D. in philosophy from King's College, Cambridge University. He currently leads the Deliberative Democracy Lab at Stanford University (formerly known as the Center for Deliberative Democracy). He has held numerous fellowships, including a Guggenheim fellowship, a fellowship at the Center for Advanced Study in the Behavioral Sciences at Stanford, a fellowship at the Woodrow Wilson International Center for Scholars, and a visiting fellow commoner role at Trinity College, Cambridge. Fishkin was elected to the American Academy of Arts and Sciences in 2014.

== Deliberative polling ==
The deliberative opinion poll, a concept proposed by Fishkin, involves gathering a representative random sample of people to deliberate on a specific issue. Participants are provided with briefing materials, carefully designed to represent all viewpoints in a balanced manner. After a day or more of deliberation, they are asked to register their considered opinions. These decisions have been used in various contexts such as electing candidates in primaries (e.g., in Greece), recommending policy decisions (e.g., in China and Texas), among other applications. It also served as the foundation for "The People's Parliament" a Channel 4 program on which Fishkin consulted, airing in the UK from 1994 to 1999.

== Publications ==
=== Books ===
==== Deliberative democracy ====
- Laslett, Peter; Fishkin, James S. (Eds). Philosophy, Politics and Society, Sixth Series: Justice Between Age Groups and Generations. New Haven and London: Yale University Press, 1992.
- Fishkin, James S. Democracy and Deliberation: New Directions for Democratic Reform. New Haven and London: Yale University Press, 1991; paperback edition, 1993.
- Fishkin, James S. The Dialogue of Justice: Toward a Self-Reflective Society. New Haven and London: Yale University Press, 1992; paperback edition, 1996.
- Fishkin, James S. The Voice of the People: Public Opinion and Democracy. New Haven and London: Yale University Press, 1995; expanded paperback edition, Fall 1997.
- Laslett, Peter and James S. Fishkin. Debating Deliberative Democracy. Oxford: Blackwell, 2003.
- Ackerman, Bruce and James S. Fishkin. Deliberation Day. New Haven and London: Yale University Press, 2004. ISBN 978-0-300-10964-1
- Fishkin, James S. When the People Speak: Deliberative Democracy and Public Consultation. Oxford: Oxford University Press, 2009. Paperback edition, 2010. Japanese edition, 2010; Chinese edition, in press.
- Fishkin, James S. Democracy When the People Are Thinking: Revitalizing Our Politics Through Public Deliberation. Oxford: Oxford University Press, 2018.

==== Political theory and philosophy ====
- Fishkin, James S. Tyranny and Legitimacy: A Critique of Political Theories. The Johns Hopkins University Press, 1979.
- Fishkin, James S. Limits of Obligation. Yale University Press, 1982.
- Fishkin, James S. Justice, Equal Opportunity and the Family. Yale University Press,1984.
- Fishkin, James S. Beyond Subjective Morality: Ethical Reasoning and Political Philosophy. Yale University Press, 1986.
- Goodin, Robert E.; Fishkin, James S. (Eds). Population and Political Theory (PPAS - Philosophy, Politics & Society). Oxford: Wiley-Blackwell, 2010.

=== Journal papers ===
- Fishkin, James S.; Jowell, Roger; Luskin, Robert C. (July 2002). "Considered opinions: deliberative polling in Britain". British Journal of Political Science. 32 (3): 455–487. doi:10.1017/S0007123402000194.
- Fishkin, James S.; List, Christian; McLean, Iain; Luskin, Robert (2002). Can deliberation induce greater preference structuration: evidence from deliberative opinion polls? Paper presented at the meeting of the American Political Science Association, Boston, 26 August – 1 September.
- Fishkin, James S.; Luskin, Robert C. (September 2005). "The quest for deliberative democracy". The Good Society. 9 (1): 4–9. JSTOR 20710913.
- Fishkin, James S.; Luskin, Robert C. (September 2005). "Experimenting with a democratic ideal: deliberative polling and public opinion". Acta Politica. 40 (3): 284–298. doi:10.1057/palgrave.ap.5500121. S2CID 144393786.
- Fishkin, James S.; Luskin, Robert C.; O'Flynn, Ian; Russell, David (December 2012). "Deliberating Across Deep Divides". Political Studies. 62 (1): 116–135. CiteSeerX 10.1.1.176.6894. doi:10.1111/j.1467-9248.2012.01005.x. S2CID 143401614.
- Fishkin, James S.; List, Christian; Luskin, Robert C.; MacLean, Ian (January 2013). "Deliberation, Single-Peakedness and the Possibility of Meaningful Democracy". The Journal of Politics. 75 (1): 80–95. doi:10.1017/S0022381612000886. S2CID 6733552.
- Fishkin, James S. (December 2013). "Deliberation by the People Themselves: Entry Points for the Public Voice". Election Law Journal: Rules, Politics, and Policy. 12 (4): 490–507. doi:10.1089/elj.2013.0200.
- Fishkin, James S.; Luskin, Robert C.; Siu, Alice (September 2014). "Europolis and the European Public Sphere: Empirical Applications of a Counter-factual Ideal". European Union Politics. 15 (3): 328–351. doi:10.1177/1465116514531507. S2CID 18309974.
- Fishkin, J., Mayega, R., Atuyambe, L., Tumuhamye, N., Ssentongo, J., Siu, A., & Bazeyo, W. (2017). Applying Deliberative Democracy in Africa: Uganda’s First Deliberative Polls. Daedalus, 146(3), 140-154. https://doi.org/10.1162/DAED_ a_00453
- Fishkin, J., & Zandanshatar, G. (2017, September 17). Deliberative Polling for Constitutional Change in Mongolia: An Unprecedented Experiment. Constitution Net.
- Fishkin, J. (2018). Random Assemblies for Lawmaking? Prospects and Limits. Politics & Society, 46(3), 359-379. https://doi.org/10.1177/0032329218789889
- Kim, N., Fishkin, J., & Luskin, R. (2018). Intergroup Contact in Deliberative Contexts: Evidence From Deliberative Polls. Journal of Communication, 68(6), 1029-1051. https://doi.org/10.1093/joc/jqy056
- Fishkin, J. (2019). Response to Critics: Toward the Reform of Actually Existing Democracies. The Good Society, 27, 190-210. https://doi.org/10.5325/goodsociety.27.1-2.0190
- Wang, R., Fishkin, J., & Luskin, R. (2020). Does Deliberation Increase Public-Spiritedness?. Social Science Quarterly, 101(6), 2163-2182. https://doi.org/10.1111/ssqu.12863
- Luskin, R., Sood, G., Fishkin, J. ., & Hahn, K. . (2021). Deliberative Distortions? Homogenization, Polarization, and Domination in Small Group Discussions. British Journal of Political Science, (2022), 21. https://doi.org/10.1017/S0007123421000168
- Fishkin, J., Siu, A., Diamond, L. ., & Bradburn, N. (2021). Is Deliberation an Antidote to Extreme Partisan Polarization? Reflections on “America in One Room”. American Political Science Review, 115(4), 1464-1481. https://doi.org/https://doi.org/10.1017/S0003055421000642
- Fishkin, J. (2021). Deliberative Public Consultation via Deliberative Polling: Criteria and Methods. Hastings Cent. Rep., 51(52), S19-S24. https://doi.org/10.1002/hast.1316
- Sandefur, J., Birdsall, N., Fishkin, J., & Moyo, M. (2022). Deliberative Democracy and the Resource Curse: A Nationwide Experiment in Tanzania. World Politics, 74(4), 564-609. https://doi.org/10.1017/S0043887122000090
