= Kultur Komitee =

Participatory cultural funding body in Winterthur, Switzerland

The Kultur Komitee Winterthur (German for "Culture Committee Winterthur") is a participatory funding body in Winterthur, Switzerland, in which residents selected by lot decide how to distribute about CHF 400,000 a year to local cultural projects. The money is provided by the Stiftung für Kunst, Kultur und Geschichte (SKKG; Foundation for Art, Culture and History), a non-profit foundation established by the Winterthur property investor Bruno Stefanini. The first committee was convened in 2021, and the process has been run annually since. It combines elements of participatory budgeting and citizens' assemblies, and from its third edition it has used the Method of Equal Shares, a proportional voting rule, alongside group deliberation.

== History ==
The SKKG's funding strategy promotes participation in cultural heritage, aimed mainly at Swiss museums and collections. In summer 2020 its board added the Kultur Komitee as an operational project of the foundation's own, so that the foundation could gain direct experience of what it means to hand over decision-making power. The board approved four editions in Winterthur, with the aims of bringing more participation into cultural funding, creating new encounters between residents, cultural practitioners and funders, and making funding easier to obtain. The project was led jointly by Mia Odermatt and Noemi Scheurer.

On 4 October 2021, the city administration sent invitations to 200 randomly selected residents, from whom a committee of twelve was originally planned. Cultural practitioners could apply for between CHF 3,000 and CHF 40,000 between December 2021 and February 2022, and the committee was given full authority over the budget. In the event, 21 people joined the first committee. It met eight times between November 2021 and June 2022, reviewed 180 applications, and funded 35 projects with a total of almost CHF 400,000.

After the first three editions, SKKG bodies approved three further editions. A fifth committee met between November 2025 and February 2026 and received 132 applications.

== Process ==
=== Selection of members ===
Members are drawn by lot from the adult population with the help of the city's residents' office and are invited by letter; those who accept form the committee. Acceptance rates have been between about six and twelve per cent. For the 2023–24 edition, the draw was weighted so that 60 per cent of those invited were women and 60 per cent were under 45. That committee's members were between 19 and 81 years old and had occupations including sports teacher, florist, service technician and nurse.

=== Deliberation and decision ===
Each edition passes through four phases: the committee is constituted; members are introduced to the city's cultural landscape through expert input and draw up a shared "funding compass" of criteria; applications are reviewed and decided; and the edition is closed. Individuals, collectives, associations and institutions from Winterthur may apply. Members review applications individually between meetings and decide in two stages, a pre-selection and a final decision, discussing first in small groups and then in plenary. The time each member was asked to commit fell from 48 hours in the first edition to 31.5 hours in the third, in order to lower barriers to taking part.

=== Use of voting algorithms ===
In the 2023–24 edition, the committee combined online voting with deliberation. Members first voted on 56 shortlisted projects on an online platform using approval voting. At the final meeting on 13 April 2024, they used an interactive tool to see which projects the Method of Equal Shares would fund at different budget levels, and decided to allocate CHF 190,000, half the budget, by this method, which selected 18 projects; they then discussed adjustments to some of the selected projects' budgets and allocated the other half through group deliberation. Under the Method of Equal Shares, each voter is assigned an equal share of the budget to spend only on projects they support, which gives groups of voters with common interests proportional influence. The committee funded 35 of the 134 projects submitted that year, with grants of between CHF 2,500 and CHF 30,000.

In the 2024–25 edition, the two signals were merged into a single calculation, "Komitee Equal Shares". Members co-defined eight "impact fields", such as curiosity and learning or community and connection, and weighted them; each member then distributed 20 points among projects, while small groups organized by impact field assessed the proposals. The algorithm treated each impact field as an additional voter with its own weighted budget and produced a "voting receipt" for each funded project showing how much of its support came from individuals and how much from the groups. Members chose to give the two sources equal weight, and the committee funded 43 of 121 proposals with a total of CHF 378,901.

== Editions ==
Kultur Komitee editions
Edition	Period	Invitations	Members	Applications	Projects funded	Grant range (CHF)
1st	2021–22	200	21	180	35	not stated
2nd	2022–23	200	12	163	37	3,000–34,000
3rd	2023–24	300	37	134	35	2,500–30,000
4th	2024–25	250	38	121	43	1,464–23,125
5th	2025–26			132		

Sources: invitations, members and applications for the first three editions from the SKKG interim report; the fourth edition from Yang and Scheurer; projects funded and grant ranges from the committee's website.

== Evaluation ==
The first edition was evaluated by the Bern University of Applied Sciences. The evaluators found that the committee was socio-demographically diverse but, because of self-selection, did not exactly reflect Winterthur's population; that developing a basis for decisions and justifying the selection of applications had proved demanding; and that most members were satisfied with the selection. They concluded that citizens can make considered funding decisions and that participatory approaches are promising.

An interim report by the SKKG on the first three editions likewise found that the committees did not represent the city's population. Women made up 19 and 42 per cent of the first two committees, and 68 and 80 per cent of members had a tertiary education, against 46 per cent of the population. The third committee, drawn with weighting and from more invitations, was 62 per cent women and 49 per cent tertiary-educated, though the report could not say which change had caused the shift. Only four members across the three editions left before the end. Members reported that they had developed clearer views on culture and more respect for cultural practitioners. More than half of applicants had little or no experience of fundraising, and interviewed practitioners estimated that 30 to 50 per cent of funded projects would not have been eligible for funding from the city. Practitioners interviewed for the report all agreed that laypeople should have a say in funding decisions, but not on their own, and some raised concerns about compromises, decisions based on taste, lack of expertise and the difficulty of funding niche work.

Researchers have studied the committee's use of voting algorithms. After the 2023–24 edition, 62 per cent of surveyed participants rated the Method of Equal Shares "very fair" and 23 per cent "somewhat fair", and 81 per cent wanted to keep the equal split between voting and deliberation. Yang and Bachmann note, however, that allowing members to modify the algorithm's selection afterwards could undermine the proportionality guarantees that motivated its use. In a study of the 2024–25 edition co-authored by one of the project's co-leaders, about 94 per cent of participants were satisfied with their opportunities to take part, and the combined method funded more, smaller projects and aligned more closely with the impact fields than methods using only individual votes or only group assessments; some participants nevertheless found the results hard to follow.

== See also ==
- Participatory budgeting
- Hybrid democratic innovations
- Sortition
- Citizens' assembly
- Method of Equal Shares
