= Wong Ho-wa =

Hong Kong data scientist and activist

- Traditional Chinese: 黃浩華
- Simplified Chinese: 黄浩华
Transcriptions
Standard Mandarin
- Hanyu Pinyin: Huáng Hàohuá
Yue: Cantonese
- Jyutping: Wong4 Hou6 Waa4

Wong Ho-wa (Chinese: 黃浩華; Jyutping: Wong4 Hou6 Waa4, also known as Howa Wong) is a Hong Kong data scientist and pro-democracy activist. He led the open government data community g0vhk from 2016 to 2021. He was an Election Committee member representing the information technology (IT) industry from 2016 to 2021 and ran for the Information Technology constituency in the 2020 Hong Kong legislative election as part of the pro-democratic caucus.

== Early life ==
Wong grew up in North District, Hong Kong and lived in a public housing estate. He attended Tung Wah Group of Hospitals Kap Yan Directors' College and Saint Francis of Assisi's College, and was a three-time medallist in the Hong Kong Olympiad in Informatics. His personal interest in democratic activism began when with the 500,000-strong demonstration against the National Security Bill 2003, in which he participated as a secondary school student.

He studied computer engineering at the Hong Kong University of Science and Technology and began his professional career in software engineering. He worked in Beijing in 2013–14. He relocated back to Hong Kong around the time of the Umbrella Movement protests and began taking part internet freedom advocacy alongside his data scientist career.

== Open data activism ==
In 2016, Wong founded g0vhk on the model of g0v Taiwan, a technology advocacy group for open government data. He led the creation of a g0vhk open political data platform collating attendance, speech, and voting records of incumbent Hong Kong legislative councillors, and information about candidates in the 2016 general election. Later that year, Wong ran for election to the Election Committee as a member of the IT Vision slate, part of the Democracy 300+ caucus to increase the pro-democratic camp's influence in the 2017 Hong Kong Chief Executive election. IT Vision won all 30 seats in the Information Technology subsector due to the multiple non-transferable vote system.

Wong advocates that public bodies not only need to make content available to the general public, but also make them available in machine-readable formats. He criticized the complacency of civil servants who think they have complied with open data regulations but only post scan images of documents. He supports legislating a Public Records Act to codify the requirements for public bodies to disclose information, because the existing Code on Access to Information lacks enforceability.

Wong believes in an approach to open data that balances the right to know and the right to privacy. He criticized the Hong Kong public sector for using privacy concerns as an excuse to withhold data, exemplifying this issue with the abundance of rumours that stemmed from the Hong Kong Police Force's reluctance to publish data about tear gas use and about arrestees at protests. On the other hand, he also campaigned against the introduction of smart lamp-posts that have the hardware capability to record pedestrians' faces. Wong opined that, even if the Hong Kong government promises not to use facial recognition technology on the lamp-post footage, such footage would be a target of cyberattacks by malicious actors with access to facial recognition. During the 2019 Hong Kong protests, Wong represented the IT industry in a Citizen's Press Conference and responded to a question about vandalism of smart lamp-posts by protesters, saying that the general public was skeptical about the true purposes of the lamp-posts. He opined that technology innovation depends on trust, thus technology policy would be meaningless unless the government attempted to regain public trust by compromising on the Five Demands.

Ahead of the 2019 Hong Kong local elections, Wong led the g0vhk project Vote4.hk, which collated public data about candidates and compiled voter guides. The pro-democratic camp won a landslide victory in the elections, but Wong criticized that the district councils continued to lag behind the trend in terms of open data, citing the difficulty for the general public to obtain data about council budgets, and even where data were available often only scans of paper documents would be provided, making it difficult for citizens to monitor their council's performance.

In January 2020, Wong Ho Wa and Vote4.hk colleagues Brian Leung and Nandi Wong saw that public information about the COVID-19 pandemic in Hong Kong was disorganized, so they created the COVID-19 in HK dashboard to collate information about confirmed cases, disease transmission hotspots, and surgical mask market prices. The dashboard attracted 400,000 page views per day during the peak of the pandemic and was maintained by a team of some 20 volunteers assisted by automatic web crawlers. Wong Ho Wa said that the hardest part of maintaining the dashboard was finding committed volunteers to fact-check reports of unscrupulous mask merchants. Wong criticized the Centre for Health Protection's (CHP) practice of withholding data about new COVID-19 cases from their website for many hours after their daily press conference, which forced data reusers to watch CHP's press conferences in order to obtain the latest data. Nevertheless, Wong commended the CHP for providing an API for its coronavirus case data and that the Hong Kong government's open data practices had improved significantly in the late 2010s, even though Hong Kong still fell short of the Open Knowledge Foundation's standards, lagging behind nearby regions like Shanghai and Taiwan.

== LegCo campaign ==
In July 2020, Charles Mok, the incumbent Information Technology functional constituency representative in Hong Kong Legislative Council (LegCo), announced that he would not seek re-election. In an interview, Mok said that he had been searching for a "Plan B" candidate in preparation for possible widespread disqualification of incumbent pro-democratic legislators, but in the process decided that he should retire from LegCo and endorse a younger candidate as his "Plan A" instead.

On 19 July, Wong Ho Wa declared his candidacy for the Information Technology constituency in the 2020 general election. In his manifesto, he said that he had been a longstanding supporter of liberal democracy. He stated that the Hong Kong national security law threatened internet freedom in Hong Kong, which was the lifeline of Hong Kong's IT industry, and that "the Great Firewall of China is now at our doorstep". He focused his campaign on using IT expertise to advocate for the freedom of information and for civic participation in government.

Commentators generally classify Wong as a moderate democrat. Wong and several other pro-democratic candidates for the functional constituencies signed the "confirmation form" pledging allegiance to the Hong Kong Basic Law, despite the form being a source of disagreement within the pro-democratic camp. Wong said he did not want to define himself in terms of any specific political faction, as he wanted to represent the broad range of political opinions within the IT industry. The 2020 general election was eventually postponed by the Hong Kong government, ostensibly due to the pandemic, and eventually replaced by the revamped 2021 Hong Kong legislative election and the 2021 Hong Kong Election Committee Subsector elections.

In January 2021, police raided Wong's home and office in Hong Kong amidst the mass arrests of participants of the pro-democracy legislative election primaries, but Wong was not arrested. The pro-democracy primaries did not include the Information Technology constituency in which Wong sought election to LegCo. In June, Wong announced that g0vhk was to be disbanded due to changes in the political climate.

The Information Technology functional constituency was abolished in the 2021 elections and replaced by a "Technology and Innovation" functional constituency whose franchise was limited to representatives of about 100 industry groups vetted by the government. Wong declined to run in the revamped elections, citing the restriction of voter franchise, and accordingly retired as an Election Committee member.
