= Mediated deliberation =

Role of media in democracy

Mediated deliberation is a form of deliberation that is achieved through the media which acts as a mediator between the mass public and elected officials. The communication professionals of the media relay information, values, and diverse points of view to the public in order for effective public deliberation to occur. Benjamin Page proposes mediated deliberation be a "division of labor" with the idea of using the media to deliver information between the elected officials and the public because modern problems make it impossible to rely on the elected officials to deliberate for the public. The role of the media is to encourage discussion amongst the citizens to keep them engaged with their elected officials.

== Ideal form ==
Mediated deliberation follows the conception of a deliberative democracy. According to Jürgen Habermas, a German philosopher, "no modern political process could function effectively without the "professionals of the media system" and the various elites who produce mediated political communication." This ideal mediated deliberation would:

to mobilize and pool relevant issues and required information, and to specify interpretations; to process such contributions discursively by means of proper arguments for and against; and to generate rationally motivated yes and no attitudes [i.e., public opinions] that are expected to determine the outcome of procedurally correct decisions.

Through this ideal model, mediated deliberation should promote public knowledge on important issues as well as encouraging public opinion through enlightenment.

To achieve an effective mediated deliberation, it requires collective responsibility from the media producers, including newspapers, television broadcasters, and the internet. The media needs to reliable because many people gain information and knowledge about events and issues. Robert Goodwin, a philosopher, described the idea of "deliberation within" which is the deliberation that occurs in an individual's mind. "The point in having a deliberative media process is for individuals to hear conflicting considerations and weigh them to arrive at their own judgments." Through the analytic and social processes of deliberation, the table shows the roles that the media producers and media users need to fulfill in order for the ideal, mediated deliberation to occur. In the analytic process, it involves introspection on subjective values while reflecting on personal and emotional experiences with facts. The following tables are copyrighted © 2008 by Sage Publications, Inc from John Gastil's book, Political Communication and Deliberation.

Analytic Process

	Media Producers	Media Users
Create a solid information base.	Present media users with a broad base of background information by reporting extensively on important issues.	Seek out opportunities to learn of others' experiences and relevant expert analysis.
Prioritize the key values at stake.	Explore the underlying public concerns behind the surface facts and events that define an issue.	Consider the diverse concerns underlying issues and how others prioritize issues differently.
Identify a broad range of solutions.	Present the broadest possible range of solutions to problems, including nongovernmental and unpopular ones.	Learn about how people like or unlike yourself think about addressing a problem.
Weigh the pros, cons, and trade-offs among solutions.	Report different viewpoints but do more than juxtapose them; subject them to careful scrutiny.	Reassess your biases favoring or opposing different solutions by seeing how others weigh pros and cons.
Make the best decision possible.	Make recommendations but keep editorial content distinct from news; leave the decision to the media user.	Take responsibility for making up your own mind after listening to the advice of experts, partisans, and others.

Along with the analytic process, the social process involves more equal access and comprehension while considering other diverse points of view.

Social Process

	Medial Producers	Media Users
Adequately distribute speaking opportunities.	Use diverse sourcing, invite diverse guests with different ways of speaking, and reach beyond conventional debates.	Make time to listen to sources with views different from your own. Add your own voice when appropriate.
Ensure mutual comprehension.	Make news and information understandable for readers; prose should be accessible to the audience.	When you cannot understand an issue or argument, seek clarification from others.
Consider other ideas and experiences.	Take arguments from all perspectives seriously.	When hearing different views, avoid tuning out or ruminating on counterarguments before considering what is said.
Respect other participants.	Model respect for different views; treat readers with respect by making news serious but engaging	Give the benefit of the doubt to sources but demand better behavior from those who violate your trust

The analytic and social processes for mediated deliberation gives people the opportunity to evaluate the actions of media producers as well as their users.

== Assessing mediated deliberation ==
=== Examples of a non-deliberative media ===
==== Jon Stewart on Crossfire ====
As the host of "The Daily Show," Jon Stewart appeared on CNN's former show Crossfire on October 15, 2004. Instead of discussing current events, Stewart argued that Crossfire "fails miserably" at providing its viewer audience with balanced information about politics. Crossfire "presented itself as part of the deliberative process yet engaged in "partisan hackery," Stewart concluded "[it was not an honest debate]". Stewart accused Crossfire of not upholding the "responsibility to the public discourse" and instead, it appeared to be a political theater. In response to Stewart's remarks, CNN canceled Crossfire in 2005.

==== Critiques of the media ====
Lance Bennett noticed that the media tend to not present balanced viewpoints for current events. Shortly after the September 11 attacks in the United States, Bennett's research showed the media coverage to represent only one, popular political party without a strong opposition party.

Benjamin Page analyzed the 1991 U.S. war against Iraq in the New York Times from November 9, 1990 to January 15, 1991 to examine whether or not the stories covered by the media were balanced and fair. Page wanted to see if there were a diversity of views about the war from a variety of sources. As a result, the editors and regular columnists consumed most of the Times in the most read sections of the paper while ordinary citizens' voices were placed in the Letters section. Page noted that few experts on the Middle East or peace groups were presented in columns even though the Times 's editors were evenly balanced among three views of the conflict with Iraq: entirely peaceful solution; the U.S. should continue to use economic sanctions followed by military intervention, if necessary; and immediate use of force. Page concluded that although the media were balanced with the three views of the editors, other major viewpoints were not included. For example, the overwhelming majority of the Times 's readers supported a more peaceful stance but their views "were not presented in proportion to their adherents among the general public". Instead, their letters were presented in the Letters section which is less read than where the editors' and regular columnists' articles are located.

Page criticizes the media for having "different media outlets [taking] distinctive political stands." Television programs tend to take stands in a more muted and subtle way through verbal statements while printed sources present their ideologies in relation to the interests of their audience over time. In addition, Page notes that "certain media outlets--especially newspapers and magazines, but sometimes also television program networks--do not merely reflect the social and political forces around them; instead, they actively work to shape political discourse to their own purposes." The media would emphasize points about a story that they want to make.

== Movement shift toward mediated deliberation ==
=== Civic/public journalism ===
Civic journalism (sometimes called public journalism) is a movement that peaked in the 1990s as an attempt to reconnect with democracy and to increase persons' trust in journalism by being more debatable, neutral, and independent with an issue. As attempts to achieve these goals, newspapers "redesigned their coverage to emphasize the concerns of citizens"; encourage citizens to discuss public issues, and change techniques in newsgathering and reporting.

On January 25, 2003, the Public Journalism Network in Georgia established a declaration which made it clear that journalists believed in maintaining these changes in journalism.

"The Public Journalism Network brings together a diverse group of print and electronic media organizations that share the same general goal of connecting with the public they serve and promoting not just media deliberation but also the kinds of conversations, discussions, and public meetings"

In brief, the Public Journalism Network Charter states:

"We believe journalism and democracy work best when news information and ideas flow freely; news fairly portrays a full range and variety of life and culture of all communities; when public deliberation is encouraged and amplified, and when news helps people function as political actors and not just political consumers...journalists should stand apart in making sound professional judgment and should not stand apart in learning about and understanding these communities...new techniques for storytelling and information-sharing to help individual communities to have their own voice as a whole set of communities...stories and images can help or hinder as people struggle to reach sound judgments about personal lives and well-being...to reach deeper into communities and serve people...listen to people...study dynamics of communities and the complexity of public life...journalism helps people see the world as a whole and helps them take responsibility for what they see."

=== Citizen Voices Project ===
Modeling after the National Issues Forums, Citizen Voices was a Philadelphian newspaper's "attempt to engage" across the diverse city during a 1999 mayoral race between a white Republican against a black Democrat. After noticing skewed responses from more educated and affluent white readers in this racially divided city, Citizen Voices aimed to encourage more public involvement from lower class minorities by creating a citizens’ issues-oriented mayoral campaign. To invite participants from all backgrounds, Citizen Voices invented "The Oprah Show" as a comedic parody of "The Oprah Winfrey Show" as a way to get citizens to think about problems and solutions within their city. The second phase of the project included a National Issues Forum-style discussion where citizens deliberated on position papers that the mayoral candidates submitted and drafted five issues with their questions for the mayoral debate including: education, jobs, neighborhoods, public safety, and reforming city hall. The issue of race was added to these five topics due to race relations complicating Philadelphia's effort to address its problems. "Throughout the year, Citizen Voices remained a frequent presence on The Philadelphia Inquirer 's opinion pages." Editorials on the campaign revolved around the issues that were picked by Citizens Voices and were even published on the commentary page in full-page layouts. Candidates were asked to respond to these questions on the issues that were drafted by citizens. As a result, it appeared that low-income participants were more willing and more confident to express their political views.

=== Investigative journalism ===
One of the best sources to see an example of a mediated deliberation is investigative journalism. The media responds and reports events that generate a lot of public concern or interests. In investigative journalism, the media conducts their own original research and investigation to uncover a news story that would have otherwise gone unnoticed. Sometimes, it is triggered from a reporter's hunch or even an outside source. For example, the Washington Post 's articles revealing the Watergate scandal involving President Richard Nixon through the famous "Deep Throat" outside source. Over the years, investigative reporting has steadily declined. In 2002, about one in 150 stories accounted for investigative journalism compared to one in 60 in 1998. This reduction has been caused by many factors including:

- the increase in profit motive to produce news that will attract the most audience attention
- the perception that the investigative reporting is not increasing audience size nor loyalty
- libel suits involving the investigative stations
- an increased demand on entertaining news

Assuming the reports are valid, investigative journalism can improve mediated deliberation by serving as an objective, unbiased source. Reporters may present the necessary information and facts of an issue needed for individuals to decide the whether or not future action needs to take place.
