= VTaiwan =

Open consultation process for policymaking in Taiwan

vTaiwan is an open consultation process in Taiwan that combines online and face-to-face discussion to bring together citizens, experts, stakeholders and government officials to deliberate on national issues, reach rough consensus and help draft legislation, chiefly on questions raised by digital technology. It was created by volunteers from the civic technology community g0v after the 2014 Sunflower Movement, at the invitation of the government. vTaiwan is best known for its use of the opinion-mapping software Pol.is, including in a 2015 consultation on regulating the ride-hailing company Uber. After government support declined, it was relaunched in 2023 as a volunteer-run community project focusing on the governance of artificial intelligence.

== History ==
=== Origins ===
In 2014, students and activists of the Sunflower Movement occupied government buildings for more than three weeks in protest against the Ma Ying-jeou government's attempt to pass the trade agreement with China, and the government afterwards invited the activists to build a platform through which it could communicate better with young people. At a g0v hackathon in December 2014, the minister without portfolio Jaclyn Tsai asked the volunteers to create a platform for "rational discussion and deliberation of policy issues" that the whole nation could take part in, and committed the government to participate and respond. g0v volunteers built vTaiwan in response. It was run as a partnership between civil society and government, with operations funded by the government but carried out by volunteers.

=== Early consultations (2015–2018) ===
The first consultation to use Pol.is, in 2015, concerned the regulation of UberX. According to the GovLab, it attracted 925 Pol.is voters, who cast 31,115 votes on 145 statements, and more than 4,000 people helped set its agenda. Participants initially split into a larger pro-Uber group and a smaller anti-Uber group, but began to propose statements addressing shared concerns such as passenger safety and liability insurance, and the debate ended with seven statements that won near-universal approval, such as "The government should set up a fair regulatory regime". Audrey Tang, a g0v contributor who later became Taiwan's digital minister, took these suggestions into face-to-face talks with Uber, taxi drivers and experts, and the government adopted regulations along the lines the consultation had produced. Hsiao, Lin, Tang, Narayanan and Sarahe use the UberX case to illustrate the open, crowdsourced character of the process.

In March 2016, about 450 citizens used vTaiwan to propose and vote on rules for the online sale of alcohol, a question that had been deadlocked for several years because of concerns that children could buy liquor online. Within weeks they agreed on recommendations, including limiting sales to a few platforms, requiring payment by credit card and collection at convenience stores, and by late April the government had turned them into a draft bill. The bill never became law, because the incoming Tsai Ing-wen administration withdrew all pending bills in 2016. Other consultations dealt with telemedicine, a regulatory "sandbox" for financial technology, the sharing economy, information security and non-consensual pornography.

By August 2018, vTaiwan's website listed 26 cases, of which 80 per cent had led to what it described as "decisive government action", and about 200,000 people had taken part in its discussions.

=== Decline and relaunch ===
The government was never obliged to follow vTaiwan's recommendations, and a 2019 bill that would have created a legal framework for handling cross-ministerial issues raised through vTaiwan did not complete its passage through the Legislative Yuan. Many of its methods were carried over to Join, a government-run petition and consultation platform that also uses Pol.is and that nearly five million people had joined by 2018.

In 2023, vTaiwan was relaunched as a community-based project focused on inclusive governance of artificial intelligence. The same year, a collaboration between vTaiwan and Chatham House was one of ten teams funded by OpenAI's "Democratic Inputs to AI" grant programme to develop processes for public input into the governance of AI. By 2025, vTaiwan operated without direct government support as a volunteer-run "civic laboratory" with five to seven active contributors and about 50 participants per event. Since 2024 it has held hybrid "Social Issue Meetups" on topics such as the Fraud Crime Hazard Prevention Act and AI governance, using Pol.is and Mentimeter alongside generative artificial intelligence tools to summarize opinions, with participants voting on whether the summaries reflect their views. Some of its input was reflected in the National Human Rights Commission's recommendations on Taiwan's draft AI Basic Act.

== Process ==
In its established form, vTaiwan consultations pass through four stages:

1. Proposal: issues are proposed, often at weekly hackathons. A government agency must agree to take responsibility for the issue, and a facilitator is assigned to guide it.
2. Opinion: public input is collected through questionnaires and online discussion. Participants post statements and vote to agree, disagree or pass on those of others, and Pol.is maps the resulting groups of opinion, showing areas of consensus and division. Agencies respond to comments in an online forum.
3. Reflection: stakeholders meet face to face, in meetings that are livestreamed with an online chat, to decide whether the issue is ready to advance or needs a further round of opinion collection.
4. Legislation: the responsible agency issues a guideline or policy, explains why no new law is needed, or sends a draft bill to the Legislative Yuan.

The process has relied on free and open-source tools, including Pol.is, the discussion forum Discourse, online questionnaires and livestreams, and has been run at low cost by volunteers.

=== Pol.is ===
In Pol.is, participants post short comments and vote on the comments of others, but cannot reply to them, a design that reduces the incentive for trolling. The system uses the voting data to produce a map that groups people who vote alike, revealing both divisions and points of agreement; participants then tend to write comments that can attract votes from more than one group. Its developers describe Pol.is as a way of scaling deliberation by mapping high-dimensional opinion spaces.

== Analysis ==
vTaiwan has been widely studied as an example of digital democracy. Its founders describe its culture as a "recursive public", in which participants also take part in shaping the process itself. In a comparative ethnography of vTaiwan and the Spanish platform Decide Madrid, both developed by civic hackers who had taken part in protest movements, Tseng describes "algorithmic empowerment" as an emerging process in which relationships between algorithms and people move towards plurality, capacity for action and the decentralization of power. Hendriks and Michels classify vTaiwan as a hybrid democratic innovation in which small-group discussion and large-scale voting are integrated within a single design.

Researchers have also used vTaiwan to test new methods. At a December 2024 workshop in Taipei on the regulation of AI, organized with the Taiwan Network Information Center, results from an online Pol.is survey were used to select divisive statements for face-to-face discussion, and participants voted on them before and after deliberating. Yang and Bachmann report that between 30 and 53 per cent of the 44 workshop participants changed their position on the statements discussed and that measures of polarization fell, though they note the small sample.

== Criticism ==
The main criticism of vTaiwan has been its lack of binding power. In 2018 the opposition legislator Jason Hsu called it "a tiger without teeth", the Sunflower activist Wu Min Hsuan argued that the government had missed opportunities to use it on larger issues such as pension reform and that it "needs real power", and the g0v co-founder C. L. Kao warned that ignoring its recommendations risked turning it into "openwashing". Beth Noveck of the GovLab nevertheless described it as "a step in the right direction" and more institutionalized than comparable projects elsewhere. The GovLab also noted that not all ministries and officials supported the process, that online participation tended to favour technology-related topics, and that its emphasis on consensus could conflict with urgent policy needs. Since the relaunch, vTaiwan's organizers have said that they lack quantitative data on how many policies their work has directly influenced.

== See also ==
- g0v
- Pol.is
- Audrey Tang
- Digital democracy
- E-participation
- Hybrid democratic innovation
- Deliberative democracy
