= Dryzek =

Dryzek is a surname. Notable people with the surname include:

- John Dryzek (born 1953), Australian political scientist
- Lucinda Dryzek (born 1991), English actress
