= Keypad polling =

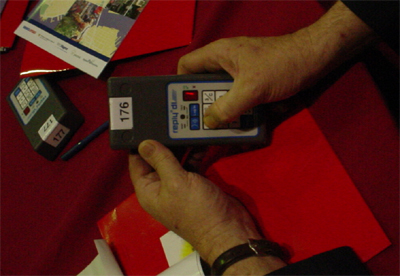

Keypad Polling is a wireless polling technology. It can be used to enable community participation in events and to bring a focus to discussion and decision making.

One example of this technology comprises a number of hand held keypads (similar to TV remote controls) which communicate using radio frequencies with a base station. This base station is connected to a laptop computer which in turn is linked to a VGA projector that displays onto a projection screen. Participants vote anonymously by selecting the number on their keypad that best represents their preference. The result of the group vote is displayed on the projection screen within seconds. The project team also works with clients to prepare suitable questionnaires and produce report documents that analyse voting results.
