= National Issues Forums =

National Issue Forums
- Abbreviation: NIF
- Successor: n/a
- Dissolved: n/a
- Type: NGO
- Legal status: Association
- Purpose: Educational
- Coordinates: 39.647913°N 84.160885°W
- Region served: Nationwide
- Website: nifi.org

The National Issues Forums (NIF) is a US-based non partisan, nationwide network of civic, educational, and other organizations and individuals whose common interest is to promote public deliberation in America. NIF sponsors public forums and training institutions for public deliberation." Everyday citizens get to deliberate on various issues through NIF forums. Some of the issues discussed include civil rights, education, energy, government, etc. "Think, Deliberate, Act" is the slogan on the NIF.

== History ==
In the summer of 1981 at the Wing-spread Conference, 17 organizations created the Domestic Policy Association. The Domestic Policy Association was a non partisan nationwide network that would deliberate each year on 3 pressing issues. The network expanded across the nation, and it provided valuable opportunities for different people to deliberate. Soon, some larger collaborating institutions initiated the forums.

== Process ==
Aimed not just to "talk" about problems, the NIF is a way for people to deliberate, or to have serious discussions on issues. In its early years, NIF depended on Public Agenda, an agency founded by Daniel Yankelovich, to select issues for NIF. Today, however, the process of selecting and framing issues for deliberation is handled by a variety of civic groups and organizations.

NIF forums make use of a moderator, (Melville, Willingham, Dedrick, 2005). While the moderator may not be an expert in the issue being discussed, his or her function is nonetheless important to the discussion. NIF moderators do several things:

1. Introduce issues.

2. Draw participants into discussion by keeping a healthy atmosphere for discussion (i.e., ask participants questions).

3. Encourage participants to consider alternatives carefully.

4. Lead the final segment of the discussion aimed at "reflecting" upon the experience.

In addition, some moderators submit reports on the forums to the National Issues Forums Institute, a research organization that studies deliberative dialogue and shares its findings with policymakers and other decision-makers. These reports, which are available to the public on the institute's website, can provide valuable insight into the public's thinking on a variety of national issues.

== Impacts on participants ==
People who believe in deliberation believe that a deliberative process is important to any responsible citizen. Overall, NIF is an enriching educational experience. A participant usually gained knowledge on the issues deliberated from the forums at NIF.

The following are the possible impacts of NIF on participants, (Melville, Willingham, Dedrick, 2005):

1. Participation in NIF forums heightens interest in specific issues and in public affair and leads to higher levels of public engagement
2. Participation in NIF forums broadens the outlook of participants.
3. As a result of participating in forums, individuals come to experience themselves in different ways, and they learn new ways of taking part in groups.
4. Participation in NIF forums enhances people's sense of themselves as political actors who can make a difference in their communities.
5. People construe their self-interest more broadly as a result of taking part in deliberative conversations.
6. Deliberation helps people move beyond superficial preferences to consider public judgment.

== See also ==
- Deliberative democracy
