= Deliberative democracy =

Form of democracy focusing on deliberation and informed decision-making

Deliberative democracy or discursive democracy is a form of democracy in which deliberation is central to decision-making. It often shows characteristics of both consensus decision-making and majority rule. Deliberative democracy differs from traditional democratic theory in that authentic deliberation, not mere voting, is the primary source of legitimacy for the law that is produced. Deliberative democracy is related to consultative democracy, in which public consultation with citizens is central to democratic processes.

Deliberative democracy can be practiced by decision-makers in both representative democracies and direct democracies. Use of the term may vary: while some practitioners and theorists use deliberative democracy to describe elected bodies whose members propose and enact legislation, Hélène Landemore and others use deliberative democracy to refer to decision-making by randomly selected lay citizens each with equal power.

Deliberative democracy has a long history of practice and theory, which can be traced back to ancient times. It received academic attention in the 1990s and implementations since 2010. Joseph M. Bessette has been credited with coining the term in his 1980 work Deliberative Democracy: The Majority Principle in Republican Government.

Recent developments combine deliberative processes with standard voting, resulting in Hybrid democratic innovations.

== Overview ==
Deliberative democracy holds that, for a democratic decision to be legitimate, it must be preceded by authentic deliberation, not merely the aggregation of views expressed by voting. Authentic deliberation is deliberation among decision-makers that is free from distortions of unequal political power, such as power a decision-maker obtains through economic wealth or the support of interest groups.

Deliberative democracy can be practiced by decision-makers in both representative democracies and direct democracies. In elitist deliberative democracy, principles of deliberative democracy apply to elite democratic decision-making bodies, such as legislatures and courts; in populist deliberative democracy, principles of deliberative democracy apply to groups of lay citizens who are directly empowered to make decisions. Populist deliberative democracy can use deliberation among a group of lay citizens to distill an authentic public opinion about societal issues for other decision-makers to consider, such as in a deliberative opinion poll. Populist deliberative democracy may also result directly in binding law. If political decisions are made by deliberation but not by the people themselves or their elected representatives, then there is no democratic element; this deliberative process is called elite deliberation.

The roots of deliberative democracy can be traced back to Aristotle and his notion of politics. The German philosopher Jürgen Habermas' work on communicative rationality and the public sphere is often identified as a major work in this area.

James Fearon and Portia Pedro believe deliberative processes most often generate ideal conditions of impartiality, rationality and knowledge of the relevant facts, resulting in more morally correct outcomes. Former diplomat Carne Ross contends that the processes are more civil, collaborative, and evidence-based than the debates in traditional town hall meetings or in internet forums if citizens know their debates will impact society. Some fear the influence of a skilled orator.

Deliberative democracy proponents typically prioritize decision-making quality over quantity by limiting decision-makers to a small group that is given the time and resources to focus on one issue. John Burnheim critiques traditional representative democracy as requiring citizens to vote for a candidate who represents a large package of policies and preferences bundled together, much of which a voter might not want. He argues that this does not translate voter preferences as carefully as deliberative groups do, if they are given the time and the ability to focus on one issue.

== Characteristics ==
=== Fishkin's model of deliberation ===
James Fishkin, who designed practical implementations of deliberative democracy through deliberative polling in various countries, described five characteristics essential for legitimate deliberation:

- Information: The extent to which participants are given access to reasonably accurate information that they believe to be relevant to the issue;
- Substantive balance: The extent to which arguments offered by one side or from one perspective are answered by considerations offered by those who hold other perspectives;
- Diversity: The extent to which the major positions in the public are represented by participants in the discussion;
- Conscientiousness: The extent to which participants sincerely weigh the merits of the arguments; and
- Equal consideration: The extent to which arguments offered by all participants are considered on the merits regardless of which participants offer them.

Studies by Fishkin and others have concluded that deliberative democracy tends to produce outcomes which are superior to those in other forms of democracy. Outcomes in their research include less partisanship and more sympathy with opposing views; more respect for evidence-based reasoning rather than opinion; a greater commitment to the decisions taken by those involved; and a greater chance for widely shared consensus to emerge, thus promoting social cohesion between people from different backgrounds. Fishkin cites extensive empirical support for the increase in public spiritedness that is often caused by participation in deliberation, and says theoretical support can be traced back to foundational democratic thinkers such as John Stuart Mill and Alexis de Tocqueville.

Fiskin along with constitutional scholar Bruce Ackerman have proposed instituting a national Deliberation Day holiday two weeks before Presidential elections where citizens would gather to debate pertinent issues.

=== Cohen's outline ===
Joshua Cohen, a student of John Rawls, argued that the five main features of deliberative democracy include:

1. An ongoing independent association with expected continuation.
2. The citizens in the democracy structure their institutions such that deliberation is the deciding factor in the creation of the institutions and the institutions allow deliberation to continue.
3. A commitment to the respect of a pluralism of values and aims within the polity.
4. The citizens consider deliberative procedure as the source of legitimacy, and prefer the causal history of legitimation for each law to be transparent and easily traceable to the deliberative process.
5. Each member recognizes and respects other members' deliberative capacity.

Cohen presents deliberative democracy as more than a theory of legitimacy, and forms a body of substantive rights around it based on achieving "ideal deliberation":

1. It is free in two ways:
  1. The participants consider themselves bound solely by the results and preconditions of the deliberation. They are free from any authority of prior norms or requirements.
  2. The participants suppose that they can act on the decision made; the deliberative process is a sufficient reason to comply with the decision reached.
2. Parties to deliberation are required to state reasons for their proposals, and proposals are accepted or rejected based on the reasons given, as the content of the very deliberation taking place.
3. Participants are equal in two ways:
  1. Formal: anyone can put forth proposals, criticize, and support measures. There is no substantive hierarchy.
  2. Substantive: The participants are not limited or bound by certain distributions of power, resources, or pre-existing norms. "The participants…do not regard themselves as bound by the existing system of rights, except insofar as that system establishes the framework of free deliberation among equals."
4. Deliberation aims at a rationally motivated consensus: it aims to find reasons acceptable to all who are committed to such a system of decision-making. When consensus or something near enough is not possible, majoritarian decision making is used.

In Democracy and Liberty, an essay published in 1998, Cohen updated his idea of pluralism to "reasonable pluralism" – the acceptance of different, incompatible worldviews and the importance of good faith deliberative efforts to ensure that as far as possible the holders of these views can live together on terms acceptable to all.

=== Gutmann and Thompson's model ===
Amy Gutmann and Dennis F. Thompson's definition captures the elements that are found in most conceptions of deliberative democracy. They define it as "a form of government in which free and equal citizens and their representatives justify decisions in a process in which they give one another reasons that are mutually acceptable and generally accessible, with the aim of reaching decisions that are binding on all at present but open to challenge in the future".

They state that deliberative democracy has four requirements, which refer to the kind of reasons that citizens and their representatives are expected to give to one another:

1. Reciprocal. The reasons should be acceptable to free and equal persons seeking fair terms of cooperation.
2. Accessible. The reasons must be given in public and the content must be understandable to the relevant audience.
3. Binding. The reason-giving process leads to a decision or law that is enforced for some period of time. The participants do not deliberate just for the sake of deliberation or for individual enlightenment.
4. Dynamic or Provisional. The participants must keep open the possibility of changing their minds, and continuing a reason-giving dialogue that can challenge previous decisions and laws.

=== Standards of good deliberation – from first to second generation (Bächtiger et al., 2018) ===
For Bächtiger, Dryzek, Mansbridge and Warren, the ideal standards of "good deliberation" which deliberative democracy should strive towards have changed:

Standards for "good deliberation"
First generation	Second generation
Respect	Unchallenged, unrevised
Absence of power	Unchallenged, unrevised
Equality	Inclusion, mutual respect, equal communicative freedom, equal opportunity for influence
Reasons	Relevant considerations
Aim at consensus	Aim at both consensus and clarifying conflict
Common good orientation	Orientation to both common good and self-interest constrained by fairness
Publicity	Publicity in many conditions, but not all (e.g. in negotiations when representatives can be trusted)
Accountability	Accountability to constituents when elected, to other participants and citizens when not elected
Sincerity	Sincerity in matters of importance; allowable insincerity in greetings, compliments, and other communications intended to increase sociality

== History ==
=== Early examples ===
Consensus-based decision making similar to deliberative democracy has been found in different degrees and variations throughout the world going back millennia. The most discussed early example of deliberative democracy arose in Greece as Athenian democracy during the sixth century BC. Athenian democracy was both deliberative and largely direct: some decisions were made by representatives but most were made by "the people" directly. Athenian democracy came to an end in 322 BC. Even some 18th century leaders advocating for representative democracy mention the importance of deliberation among elected representatives.

=== Recent scholarship ===
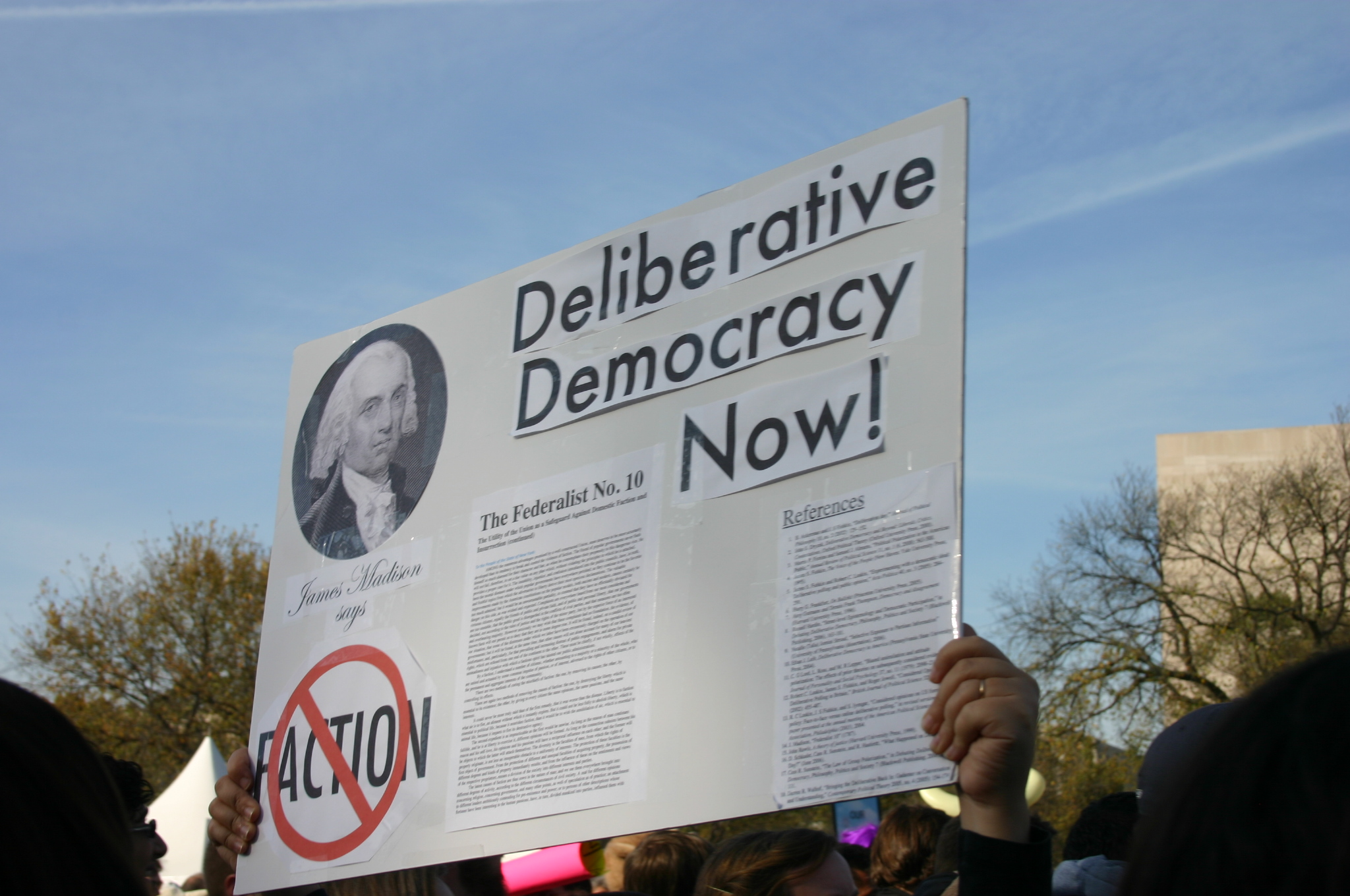
Call for the establishment of deliberative democracy seen at the Rally to Restore Sanity and/or Fear

The deliberative element of democracy was not widely studied by academics until the late 20th century. According to Professor Stephen Tierney, perhaps the earliest notable example of academic interest in the deliberative aspects of democracy occurred in John Rawls 1971 work A Theory of Justice. Joseph M. Bessette has been credited with coining the term "deliberative democracy" in his 1980 work Deliberative Democracy: The Majority Principle in Republican Government, and went on to elaborate and defend the notion in "The Mild Voice of Reason" (1994). In the 1990s, deliberative democracy began to attract substantial attention from political scientists. According to Professor John Dryzek, early work on deliberative democracy was part of efforts to develop a theory of democratic legitimacy. Theorists such as Carne Ross advocate deliberative democracy as a complete alternative to representative democracy. The more common view, held by contributors such as James Fishkin, is that direct deliberative democracy can be complementary to traditional representative democracy. Others contributing to the notion of deliberative democracy include Carlos Nino, Jon Elster, Roberto Gargarella, John Gastil, Jürgen Habermas, David Held, Joshua Cohen, Amy Gutmann, Noëlle McAfee, Rense Bos, Jane Mansbridge, Jose Luis Marti, Dennis Thompson, Benny Hjern, Hal Koch, Seyla Benhabib, Ethan Leib, Charles Sabel, Jeffrey K. Tulis, David Estlund, Mariah Zeisberg, Jeffrey L. McNairn, Iris Marion Young, Robert B. Talisse, and Hélène Landemore.

Although political theorists took the lead in the study of deliberative democracy, political scientists have in recent years begun to investigate its processes. One of the main challenges currently is to discover more about the actual conditions under which the ideals of deliberative democracy are more or less likely to be realized.

Drawing on the work of Hannah Arendt, Shmuel Lederman laments the fact that "deliberation and agonism have become almost two different schools of thought" that are discussed as "mutually exclusive conceptions of politics" as seen in the works of Chantal Mouffe, Ernesto Laclau, and William E. Connolly. Giuseppe Ballacci argues that agonism and deliberation are not only compatible but mutually dependent: "a properly understood agonism requires the use of deliberative skills but also that even a strongly deliberative politics could not be completely exempt from some of the consequences of agonism".

Most recently, scholarship has focused on the emergence of a 'systemic approach' to the study of deliberation. This suggests that the deliberative capacity of a democratic system needs to be understood through the interconnection of the variety of sites of deliberation which exist, rather than any single setting. Some studies have conducted experiments to examine how deliberative democracy addresses the problems of sustainability and underrepresentation of future generations. Although not always the case, participation in deliberation has been found to shift participants' opinions in favour of environmental positions.

=== Platforms and algorithms ===
Aviv Ovadya also argues for implementing bridging-based algorithms in major platforms by empowering deliberative groups that are representative of the platform's users to control the design and implementation of the algorithm. He argues this would reduce sensationalism, political polarization and democratic backsliding. Jamie Susskind likewise calls for deliberative groups to make these kind of decisions. Meta commissioned a representative deliberative process in 2022 to advise the company on how to deal with climate misinformation on its platforms.

=== Modern examples ===
The OECD documented hundreds of examples and finds their use increasing since 2010. For example, a representative sample of 2500 lay citizens used a 'Citizens' congress' to coalesce around a plan on how to rebuild New Orleans after Hurricane Katrina.

== Deliberation at scale ==
Deliberative theories were often developed with face-to-face discussion in mind, which works well in a jury room or a town meeting but becomes difficult when the relevant public numbers in the thousands or millions. Much theoretical and practical work since the 1990s has addressed how deliberation can be made to work among, or on behalf of, a large number of people.

=== Challenges ===
Time, numbers and distance. Goodin argues that the ideal of every affected person exchanging reasons with every other is workable in small societies but not in large ones, because the time needed for everyone to speak and be heard grows with the number of participants, and participants are dispersed geographically. After reviewing attempts to overcome these constraints, he proposes shifting much of the deliberative work inside each citizen's head, with people reflecting on the perspectives of absent others rather than conversing with them directly.

The democratic trilemma. Fishkin describes a "trilemma" between three democratic values: political equality, mass participation and deliberation. Institutions that achieve any two of them tend to sacrifice the third. A referendum gives everyone an equal vote but involves little deliberation; a deliberating random sample is equal and deliberative but involves only a few hundred people; and open, self-selected forums can be both deliberative and participatory, but their participants are unrepresentative of the wider public.

Self-selection. In open processes the people who choose to take part tend to differ systematically from the rest of the population. Even when organizers recruit by lottery, the pool of people who accept an invitation over-represents some groups, such as university graduates, so that meeting demographic quotas forces some volunteers to be selected with much lower probability than others. A study of the online forum that accompanied Iceland's 2011 constitution-drafting process found that the forum was responsive and mostly on topic, but that participation was uneven and the contributors formed a self-selected, relatively homogeneous group.

Group polarization. Sunstein argues that when members of a group of like-minded people deliberate together, they typically end up holding a more extreme version of the position the group tended towards beforehand. He presents this as a danger for deliberative designs in which discussion takes place among like-minded people, such as within isolated enclaves.

Information overload. Open online platforms allow mass participation, but Klein notes that they tend to generate large volumes of disorganized, redundant contributions of uneven quality, which no single participant can read in full. In large deliberations it also becomes hard to direct participants' attention to the issues where their input is most needed.

Connecting small forums to the wider public. Methods that deliberate in small groups raise the question of why the rest of the public should accept their conclusions. Lafont argues that giving binding power to randomly selected mini-publics would ask citizens to defer blindly to the judgment of a few, a "shortcut" that bypasses the deliberation of the public at large.

=== Methods ===
==== Random selection and mini-publics ====
The most widespread response to the trilemma is to deliberate on behalf of the public rather than with all of it. Fung calls such deliberately constructed forums "minipublics" and classifies the design choices they involve, including how participants are selected and recruited, what they discuss, how they deliberate, and how much power they have. Recruiting participants by sortition lets a group of a few hundred people approximate the views of the whole population, preserving political equality without requiring everyone to take part.

To counter self-selection in the pool of volunteers, Flanigan, Gölz, Gupta, Hennig and Procaccia developed a selection algorithm that satisfies demographic quotas while making the selection probabilities of all volunteers as equal as possible. On ten real datasets it gave the least-likely volunteers a substantially higher chance of selection than the algorithm previously in use, and by mid-2021 the Sortition Foundation alone had used it to select more than 40 panels.

Several countries have used randomly selected assemblies on major national questions. In Ireland, the Citizens' Assembly of 2016–18 followed the Convention on the Constitution of 2012–14, and the two bodies played a significant role in the constitutional referendums on same-sex marriage (2015) and abortion (2018). In France, the Citizens' Convention for Climate of 2019–20 was commissioned to bring together 150 randomly chosen citizens. They were randomly assigned to five thematic working groups (housing, work and production, transport, food, and consumption) whose proposals were then voted on in plenary, and the convention approved 149 measures. An assessment by participant observers found that the steering and expert bodies strongly framed the agenda, although the citizens kept responsibility for the final output.

==== Small facilitated groups and plenary sessions ====
Large deliberative events commonly divide participants into many small groups, each led by a moderator, and alternate these with plenary sessions. In the Deliberative Poll "America in One Room", held in Dallas in September 2019, a national random sample of 526 registered voters was split into moderated groups of about 13 people. Questions agreed on in the small groups were put to balanced panels of experts in plenary sessions. Participants' policy attitudes on many of the most polarized issues moved substantially closer across party lines.

Facilitation also addresses the risk of group polarization. In an experiment on attitudes toward the Swedish language in Finland, Strandberg, Himmelroos and Grönlund placed participants in like-minded groups and found that free discussion polarized them, whereas groups that followed deliberative rules under a facilitator did not; the result held both face-to-face and online.

The "21st Century Town Meeting" format developed by AmericaSpeaks combined small-group discussion with electronic aggregation. At "Listening to the City", held in New York in July 2002 to discuss plans for rebuilding the World Trade Center site, more than 4,500 people sat at tables of 10 to 12, each with a trained facilitator, and used wireless keypads to vote on questions whose results were displayed immediately on large screens; several hundred more took part online.

==== Linking mini-publics to wider institutions ====
A further question is how the conclusions of a mini-public reach the wider political system. Goodin and Dryzek list several ways this can happen, including directly shaping policy, informing public debate, testing proposals before they are adopted, legitimating policies, and enabling popular oversight of officials. Ireland's practice of putting assembly recommendations to a national referendum is one way of giving the whole electorate the final say.

The German-speaking Community of Belgium has built such a link into its parliamentary process. A standing Citizens' Council chosen by lot sets the agenda and convenes Citizens' Assemblies, also chosen by lot, on topics of its choice. Their recommendations are discussed in a joint committee with members of parliament and the responsible minister, who must state whether and how each recommendation will be implemented and justify any rejection.

==== Online platforms ====
Online tools reduce the cost of bringing many small groups together and can automate parts of the facilitator's role. The Stanford Online Deliberation Platform runs video-based small-group discussions without human moderators: it manages a speaking queue, prompts quieter participants to speak, flags uncivil language and moves each group through the agenda. In a study on climate policy, 962 participants deliberated in 104 groups of about ten people; participants shifted on most issues, and the shifts crossed party lines. The same platform hosted the Meta Community Forum, a Deliberative Poll on harassment in virtual-reality spaces, in which more than 6,300 people from 32 countries deliberated in 23 languages.

Other tools forgo conversation in small groups and instead structure the contributions of a very large crowd. In Pol.is, participants submit short statements and react to those of others; the system maps the resulting opinion space, identifies groups of participants with similar views, and highlights statements that win support across groups. Its developers report that this design helps surface points of consensus and discourages trolling. Pol.is has been used in vTaiwan, an open consultation process launched in Taiwan in 2014 that combines online and offline deliberation to reach rough consensus on digital legislation. Hsiao, Lin, Tang, Narayanan and Sarahe describe its use in drafting regulations for the ride-hailing service Uber. Argument-mapping systems such as the MIT Deliberatorium take a related approach, organizing contributions into a tree of issues, ideas and arguments, and Klein proposes metrics that direct participants' attention to the parts of the map where their input is most needed.

In Iceland, a Constitutional Council of 25 members drafted a new constitution in 2011 while posting its work on social media and inviting comments from the public, receiving several thousand. In a consultative referendum in 2012, about two-thirds of voters supported using the draft as the basis for a new constitution, but Parliament did not adopt it.

==== AI-assisted mediation ====
Researchers have also experimented with using large language models to perform the mediator's task of summarizing views and drafting statements that a group can endorse. In a study published in Science in 2024, an AI system called Habermas Machine (named after Jürgen Habermas) took participants' individual opinions and critiques and iteratively drafted group statements on contested political questions. Across experiments with 5,734 participants, the AI-generated statements were rated as more informative, clearer and less biased than those written by human mediators; participants' views tended to converge after deliberation, and the most successful statements incorporated minority perspectives. The results were replicated in a virtual citizens' assembly drawn from a demographically representative sample of the UK population.

== See also ==
- Deliberative assembly
- Deliberative referendum
- Group decision making
- Hybrid democratic innovations
- Jury
- Informed consent
- Liquid democracy
- Mediated deliberation
- Open source governance
- Participatory democracy
- Political equality
- Public reason
- Radical democracy
- Citizens' assembly

== Sources ==
- Bessette, Joseph (1980). "Deliberative Democracy: The Majority Principle in Republican Government". In Goldwin, Robert A; Schambra, William A. (eds.). How Democratic is the Constitution?. Washington, D.C.: American Enterprise Institute for Public Policy Research. pp. 102–116. ISBN 9780844734002. OCLC 6816158.
- Bessette, Joseph (1994). The Mild Voice of Reason: Deliberative Democracy & American National Government. Chicago: University of Chicago Press. ISBN 9780226044231. OCLC 28677011.
- Blattberg, C. (2003) "Patriotic, Not Deliberative, Democracy" Critical Review of International Social and Political Philosophy 6, no. 1, pp. 155–74. Reprinted as ch. 2 of Blattberg, C. (2009) Patriotic Elaborations: Essays in Practical Philosophy. Montreal and Kingston: McGill-Queen's University Press.
- Burke, Edmund (1854). The Works of the Right Honourable Edmund Burke. London: Henry G. Bohn.
- Cohen, Joshua (1989). "Deliberative Democracy and Democratic Legitimacy". In Hamlin, Alan P; Pettit, Philip (eds.). The Good Polity: Normative Analysis of the State. Oxford, UK: B. Blackwell. pp. 17–34. ISBN 9780631158042. OCLC 18321533.
- Cohen, Joshua (1997). "Deliberation and Democratic Legitimacy". In Bohman, James; Rehg, William (eds.). Deliberative Democracy: Essays on Reason and Politics. Cambridge, MA: MIT Press. ISBN 9780262024341. OCLC 36649504.
- Dryzek, John (2010). Foundations and Frontiers of Deliberative Governance. Oxford University Press. ISBN 978-0-19-956294-7.
- Elster, Jon, ed. (1998). Deliberative Democracy (Cambridge Studies in the Theory of Democracy). Cambridge University Press. ISBN 978-0-521-59696-1.
- Fishkin, James (2011). When the People Speak. Oxford University Press. ISBN 978-0-19-960443-2.
- Fishkin, James; Laslett, Peter (2003). Debating Deliberative Democracy. Wiley-Blackwell. ISBN 9781405100434. OCLC 49875309.
- Fishkin, James S.; Luskin, Robert C. (September 2005). "Experimenting with a democratic ideal: deliberative polling and public opinion". Acta Politica. 40 (3): 284–298. doi:10.1057/palgrave.ap.5500121. S2CID 144393786.
- Gutmann, Amy; Thompson, Dennis F. (1996). Democracy and Disagreement. Princeton University Press. ISBN 9780674197664. OCLC 34472979.
- Gutmann, Amy; Thompson, Dennis F. (2004). Why Deliberative Democracy?. Princeton: Princeton University Press. ISBN 9780691120188. OCLC 54066447.
- Leib, Ethan J. "Can Direct Democracy Be Made Deliberative?", Buffalo Law Review, Vol. 54, 2006
- Mansbridge, Jane J.; Parkinson, John; et al. (2012), "A systematic approach to deliberative democracy", in Mansbridge, Jane J.; Parkinson, John (eds.), Deliberative systems, Cambridge: Cambridge University Press, pp. 1–26, ISBN 9781107025394
- Nino, C. S. (1996). The Constitution of Deliberative Democracy. New Haven: Yale University Press. ISBN 0-300-07727-0.
- Owen, D. and Smith, G. (2015). "Survey article: Deliberation, democracy, and the systemic turn." Journal of Political Philosophy 23.2: 213–234
- Painter, Kimberly, (2013) "Deliberative Democracy in Action: Exploring the 2012 City of Austin Bond Development Process" Applied Research Project Texas State University.
- Ross, Carne (2011). The Leaderless Revolution: How Ordinary People Can Take Power and Change Politics in the 21st Century. Simon & Schuster. ISBN 978-1-84737-534-6.
- Smith, Graham (2003). Deliberative Democracy and the Environment (Environmental Politics). Routledge. ISBN 978-0-415-30940-0.
- Steenhuis, Quinten. (2004) "The Deliberative Opinion Poll: Promises and Challenges". Carnegie Mellon University. Unpublished thesis. Available Online Archived 8 March 2005 at the Wayback Machine
- Talisse, Robert B (2004). Democracy after Liberalism Pragmatism and Deliberative Politics. New York: Routledge. ISBN 9786610106332. OCLC 1264786012.
- Thompson, Dennis F (2008). "Deliberative Democratic Theory and Empirical Political Science," Annual Review of Political Science 11: 497–520. ISBN 978-0824333119
- Tulis, Jeffrey K., (1988) The Rhetorical Presidency Publisher: Princeton University Press (ISBN 0-691-07751-7)
- Tulis, Jeffrey K., (2003) "Deliberation Between Institutions," in Debating Deliberative Democracy, eds. James Fishkin and Peter Laslett. Wiley-Blackwell. ISBN 978-1405100434
- Uhr, J. (1998) Deliberative Democracy in Australia: The Changing Place of Parliament, Cambridge: Cambridge University Press ISBN 0-521-62465-7
