= Carlos Santiago Nino =

Argentine philosopher (1943–1993)

Carlos Santiago Nino (3 November 1943 – 29 August 1993) was an Argentine moral, legal and political philosopher.

== Biography ==
Nino studied law at the University of Buenos Aires and at the University of Oxford, where he received his Ph.D. in 1977 with a thesis directed by John Finnis and Tony Honoré.

Nino began his academic activity in the early 1970s, concentrating on some traditional issues in jurisprudence, such as the concept of a legal system, the interpretation of the law, the debate between legal positivism and natural law, and the concept of validity. After realizing the need to clarify the normative problems involved in some of those issues, he was led to embrace a model based on the explicit adoption of principles of justice and social morality, rejecting the predominant German-inspired "dogmatic" approach. This signaled the beginning of his philosophical investigations, which were always oriented to practical issues, and marked by a distinctively analytical approach. His need to provide a liberal justification for criminal law practice thus lead him to moral philosophy, and to the development of an original "consensual" theory of punishment which combined the merits of the retributive and utilitarian (see deterrence) varieties while avoiding their respective difficulties. Similarly, the problems presented by the characterization of criminal conduct stimulated his work in the field of philosophy of action.

During the early 1980s, after the restoration of democracy, Nino became engaged in politics, serving as personal assistant to President Raúl Alfonsín and as coordinator of his newly created "Consejo para la consolidación de la democracia", a special committee for the study and design of institutional reforms. His theoretical activities, however, were not forgotten: in 1984 he published his monumental Ética y derechos humanos, dedicated to Alfonsín, where he provided a comprehensive exposition of his moral thought; divided in three parts, it dealt with normative and applied ethics, as well as with meta-ethics. This last field he expanded in a separate volume, where he adopted a constructivist approach that attempted to derive his fundamental ethical principles from the presuppositions of moral discourse, in a manner that put him, as he said, "between Rawls and Habermas". These substantive principles, comprising the nucleus of a theory that aspired to capture the essential components of political liberalism, were the principle of autonomy, the principle of inviolability, and the principle of dignity. The first expressed Nino's conception of the good: those things, and those things only, that were valued by the individual in question. The second imposed deontological restrictions to the pursuit of that good, prohibiting the sacrifice of some to achieve the benefit of others. The third principle allowed for individual consent, thus permitting persons to waive the rights recognized by the second one.

With this solid normative foundation, Nino went to tackle some practical issues, such as abortion, capital punishment, and drug regulation. On the former, he proposed a gradualist approach similar to the American one, recognizing rights to the fetuses only when they showed the cognitive and affective capacities necessary for considering them moral persons. As regards death penalty, he was firmly opposed to it—as he was to the criminalization of drug consumption.

While on trip to La Paz, Bolivia in 1993 to work on the reform of the Bolivian constitution, Nino had an asthma attack and subsequently died. This tragedy killed a man who appeared to be at the peak of his productivity: the year before he had published two books, served as editor to two others, and had given the manuscripts of a couple more to his friend Owen Fiss, who assumed the responsibility of readying them for publication. The Constitution of Deliberative Democracy and Radical Evil on Trial saw the light in 1996. In the first he developed his "epistemic justification" of deliberative democracy, arguing that democratic deliberation provides better reasons to believe in the validity of moral norms than private reflection. The second is a moving personal description of the military junta trials; it provides a testimony to his unique ability to approach public affairs with both philosophical sophistication and political commitment.
