= Hybrid democratic innovation =

Democratic designs that combine deliberation and voting

A hybrid democratic innovation (HDI) is a process that combines concentrated deliberation among a relatively small group of citizens with large-scale voting by a wider public. Examples include citizens' assemblies whose proposals are put to a referendum, panels that review ballot measures for voters, Deliberative Polls required before constitutional change, and forms of participatory budgeting in which face-to-face discussion is combined with online voting. The idea draws on deliberative democracy, which emphasizes the exchange of reasons, and on direct and plebiscitary democracy, which emphasize mass participation and decision by vote.

== Rationale ==
Hendriks and Michels argue that deliberative and plebiscitary designs have complementary strengths and weaknesses. Deliberative mini-publics support high-quality dialogue but reach few people and often have little political impact, while plebiscitary designs such as referendums reach many people and carry political weight but do little to support considered discussion. Hybrid designs aim to combine the strengths of both. They assess such designs against three democratic values: inclusion, the quality of deliberation, and impact on decisions.

Deliberative theory has increasingly recognized that deliberation and voting depend on each other. Chambers and Warren reverse the usual question of what deliberation does for voting and identify seven ways in which voting benefits deliberation: it provides a feasible and fair way of closing a discussion; it affirms participants' equal status; it brings political conflict into deliberation; it encourages participants to state their sincere views; it registers and preserves dissent; non-binding votes help define the issues and show where agreement and disagreement lie; and public votes allow representatives to be held to the positions they argue for. Felicetti proposes the concept of "democratic assemblage" as a way of understanding and reforming democracies, starting from the diverse democratic practices found in social movements and democratic innovations.

== Theoretical foundations ==
=== Deliberation and social choice ===
Social choice theory shows that aggregating individual preferences by voting can produce outcomes that are cyclical, unstable or open to manipulation, as in Arrow's impossibility theorem and the Gibbard–Satterthwaite theorem. Dryzek and List argue that the two traditions of voting and deliberation, usually seen as opposed, can be reconciled: the impossibility results identify the conditions under which meaningful democratic decisions are possible, and deliberation can help bring those conditions about. On this view social choice theory does not show that democracy is impossible, but that it must have a deliberative element.

One such condition is that preferences be single-peaked, meaning that voters order the options along a shared dimension; when this holds, majority voting cannot produce a cycle. List, Luskin, Fishkin and McLean tested this using data from Deliberative Polls. Comparing participants' rankings of policy options before and after deliberation, they found that preferences moved closer to single-peakedness, without deliberation having to produce unanimity. The increase was larger for issues of lower public salience and for participants who appeared to have deliberated more effectively.

=== Voting rules and deliberation ===
The rule a group will use to decide can change how its members deliberate. In a game-theoretic model of a committee that debates before voting, Austen-Smith and Feddersen show that when members are uncertain about one another's preferences, majority rule can support full sharing of private information in debate under conditions where unanimity rule cannot. In laboratory experiments comparing simple majority, two-thirds majority and unanimity, Goeree and Yariv found that without communication the three rules produced significantly different outcomes, but that when groups could deliberate first, the differences between rules largely disappeared and decisions became more efficient.

=== Sequencing and systems ===
Goodin argues that deliberation need not take place within a single body: in a "distributed" model, different actors perform different deliberative roles at different stages of a decision process, and the process as a whole can be deliberative enough even if no single stage displays every deliberative virtue. This idea underlies designs in which a small deliberative body prepares or scrutinizes a question that a larger public then votes on.

== Typology ==
Hendriks and Michels classify hybrid designs along two dimensions: whether deliberative or plebiscitary elements merely supplement representative democracy or reinforce one another within it, and whether the elements are sequenced, one following the other, or lateral, running alongside each other within a single design. This gives four types:

- Type 1 (sequenced, supplementing): direct democracy operating alongside representative institutions, as in California's system of ballot initiatives.
- Type 2 (lateral, supplementing): deliberation and representation fused in one institution, as in the Gentofte model in Denmark, in which elected politicians and appointed citizens work together in temporary committees.
- Type 3 (sequenced, reinforcing): a deliberative body followed by a public vote, or the reverse. Examples include Ireland's citizens' assemblies followed by referendums, the British Columbia Citizens' Assembly and the Oregon Citizens' Initiative Review; in Belgium's G1000, a public vote selected the topics before the citizens' forum met.
- Type 4 (lateral, reinforcing): small-group discussion and large-group voting integrated in one design, as in "participatory budgeting new style" and digital platforms such as vTaiwan and Decidim.

The authors note that Type 3 designs are well known, while Type 4 designs have been studied much less.

== Forms ==
=== Deliberative polling ===
Fishkin proposed the deliberative opinion poll, in which a random sample of citizens is surveyed, deliberates in moderated small groups and plenary sessions with experts, and is surveyed again, so that the change in opinion indicates what the public would think if it had the opportunity to deliberate. Mansbridge argues that the efforts Deliberative Polls make to secure a representative random sample make them the standard against which other mini-publics should be judged, while noting that they sacrifice widespread participation for deliberation and political equality.

In 2017 Mongolia passed a law requiring a Deliberative Poll before parliament can consider amendments to constitutional provisions concerning the parliament, the presidency and the prime minister. In the first such poll, held in April 2017, 669 randomly selected citizens deliberated for a weekend in Ulaanbaatar, answering the same questionnaire before and after small-group discussions and plenary sessions with competing experts. Support for a second parliamentary chamber fell from 61 to 30 per cent, and support for giving the prime minister power to appoint and dismiss cabinet members rose from 57 to 73 per cent. Fishkin and Zandanshatar report that the draft amendment then before parliament included the strengthened prime minister but not the proposals the poll had rejected. Odonkhuu criticized the process, arguing that the briefing materials were unbalanced, that some questions were leading, and that because the ruling party chose the themes and could disregard the results, the poll risked legitimizing reforms that had already been decided.

=== Citizens' assemblies and referendums ===
Hendriks and Wagenaar distinguish three ways of linking citizens' assemblies to referendums, which have long been seen as antithetical: a referendum-preparing assembly drafts the proposal that voters later decide on; a referendum-scrutinizing assembly informs voters about a question that has already been set, and may give non-binding advice; and a referendum-elaborating assembly meets after a vote to help interpret the result and plan what follows. They conclude that the "deliberative referendum" is an idea whose time has come, but that fitting deliberative bodies into direct democracy and embedding hybrid designs in different political systems remain significant challenges.

==== Referendum-preparing assemblies ====
In 2004 the government of British Columbia created a Citizens' Assembly on Electoral Reform of 160 citizens chosen by a nearly random method to assess and, if it chose, redesign the province's electoral system. The assembly recommended replacing first-past-the-post voting with a form of single transferable vote, and the recommendation was put to province-wide referendums. In 2005 it won 57.7 per cent of the vote, short of the 60 per cent threshold the government had set, and in 2009 it won 39.1 per cent. In Ireland, recommendations of the Convention on the Constitution and the Citizens' Assembly were put to the electorate in the referendums on same-sex marriage in 2015 and abortion in 2018.

==== Referendum-scrutinizing assemblies ====
The Citizens' Initiative Review (CIR), adopted into law in Oregon and tested in several other US states as well as Switzerland and Finland, attaches a deliberative panel to a popular initiative vote. A demographically stratified random sample of registered voters hears from advocates on both sides and from neutral experts over four to five days and then writes a guide for voters setting out the key facts and the strongest arguments for and against the measure. Gastil, Ársælsson, Knobloch, Brinker, Richards, Reedy and Burkhalter pooled survey experiments from 13 reviews held between 2010 and 2018 in five states, involving 10,872 registered voters. Reading the panel's statement increased voters' knowledge of the measures, although the effects were small in most cases; Democrats and Republicans gained at similar rates, and voters with greater trust in deliberation gained somewhat more.

==== Evidence ====
A systematic review by Witting, Wagenaar and Hendriks of 55 publications on combining referendums with deliberative processes found a clear overlap between the shortcomings attributed to referendums, including their deliberative deficit, and the benefits ascribed to deliberation. The review also found that negative or neutral effects were both anticipated and observed, which the authors take to show the importance of connecting the aggregative and deliberative parts appropriately and of embedding them in the wider political system.

=== Mini-publics and maxi-publics ===
Itten and Mouter studied a process in the Dutch municipality of Súdwest-Fryslân designed to keep a climate mini-public connected to the wider public. In 2020 about 45 citizens, selected at random from volunteers with demographic quotas, drafted six options for the local energy transition; 1,356 residents then weighed the options online in a "participatory value evaluation", distributing points among them and giving reasons; and a second panel of twelve citizens drawn from the online participants wrote recommendations based on the results. The municipal council adopted the advice unanimously. The authors note that the findings come from a single local case without a control group.

=== Participatory budgeting ===
Participatory budgeting began in Porto Alegre, Brazil, after the Workers' Party took over the city government in 1989. It combined deliberation and voting at several levels: citizens met in regional and, from 1994, thematic assemblies to discuss and vote on investment priorities, and elected delegates who in turn elected a municipal budget council. Baiocchi reports that participation rose from under 1,000 people in 1990 to more than 16,000 in 1998, and that years of participation, rather than income or education, were the strongest predictor of being elected a delegate.

Hendriks and Michels describe a later "participatory budgeting new style", which adds large-scale online voting, made possible by internet access and smartphones in the 2010s, to group deliberation. In the district of Antwerp, Belgium, whose Citizens' Budget (Burgerbegroting) began in 2014, residents select priority themes and divide about ten per cent of the district budget among them, submit project proposals, and choose projects both at deliberative tables of five and in an online vote; since 2022 the rules have aimed to give the deliberative and online components roughly equal weight. About 4.1 per cent of the population took part in 2020. The authors found that the hybrid design made participation broader than in a typical mini-public and that the district council has habitually adopted the results, but also that interest in the time-consuming offline meetings declined after online voting was introduced, a possible displacement of participation from deliberation to voting.

Online tools have been designed to make participation in such processes more engaging. Gastil and Broghammer propose an online participatory budgeting system that uses game mechanics, linked to theories of motivation, to draw on people's drives to meet basic needs, form social connections and gain status.

Research in computational social choice has also produced voting rules for participatory budgeting that aim at proportional outcomes. Peters, Pierczyński and Skowron formulate axioms that guarantee proportional representation to groups of voters with common interests and propose the Method of Equal Shares, under which each voter receives an equal share of the budget to spend only on projects they support. The Kultur Komitee in Winterthur, Switzerland, in which residents selected by lot decide on funding for local cultural projects, combined this rule with deliberation in its 2023–24 cycle: 37 members first voted online on 56 shortlisted projects, then decided at a final meeting to allocate half of the CHF 381,500 budget by the Method of Equal Shares and the other half through group deliberation.

=== Digital platforms ===
Several online platforms combine voting with forms of discussion at a scale that face-to-face processes cannot reach. In Pol.is, participants submit short statements and vote to agree or disagree with those of others; the system maps the resulting opinion space, identifies groups of participants with similar views, and highlights statements that win support across groups. Pol.is has been used in vTaiwan, an open consultation process launched in Taiwan in 2014 that combines online and offline deliberation to reach rough consensus on digital legislation. Hendriks and Michels classify vTaiwan, together with platforms such as Decidim in Barcelona and Frankfurt fragt mich in Frankfurt, as lateral hybrids of the fourth type.

== Criticism and challenges ==
Studies of hybrid designs have identified several tensions. In Antwerp, Hendriks and Michels found that the deliberative component offset the effects of mass voting only when it made up a substantial share of the combined result, that deliberative quality could not be maximized within a hybrid design, and that impact depended on elected politicians' willingness to adopt the outcomes. Witting, Wagenaar and Hendriks emphasize that the benefits of adding deliberation to referendums depend on how the parts are connected. Critics of the Mongolian Deliberative Poll argued that a deliberative stage controlled by the governing party can be used to legitimize decisions already taken. Where algorithms are used to aggregate votes, Yang and Bachmann note that allowing deliberating participants to modify an algorithm's selection can undermine the proportionality guarantees that motivated its use.

== See also ==
- Deliberative democracy
- Direct democracy
- Citizens' assembly
- Deliberative opinion poll
- Deliberative referendum
- Participatory budgeting
- Sortition
