= Deliberative referendum =

A deliberative referendum is a referendum that increases public deliberation through purposeful institutional design.^{:557} The term "deliberative referendum" stems from deliberative democracy,^{:509} which emphasises that "the legitimacy of decisions can be increased if...decisions are preceded by authentic deliberation."^{:903} Deliberative design features can promote public deliberation prior to and during the referendum vote to increase its actual and perceived legitimacy.^{:910} Deliberative referendums encourage open-minded and informed reasoning, rather than rigid "pre-formed opinions".^{:508-512} "[A]fter deliberations, citizens routinely alter their preferences".^{:910}

In practice, a deliberative referendum includes a variety of institutional design features. These include using a citizens' jury to set referendum questions and educate the public, further public education via mandatory interactive tutorials before voting, and focusing referendums on broad values rather than technicalities. Some authors note how legal regulation can also aid referendum deliberation.^{:523}

One deliberative referendum method is the Citizens' Initiative Review; this is a randomly-selected body, similar to a citizen's jury, convened specifically to deliberate on a ballot initiative or referendum that voters in the same jurisdiction (such as a city, state, province, or country) will later vote on.

Constitutional deliberative referendums can "provide citizens with a meaningful say in determining the most fundamental constitutional decisions that affect their lives".^{:510} Voter deliberation is significant here as the referendum result could change the state's political status or impact the enjoyment of human rights.^{:559}
