= Voting =

Method to make collective decisions

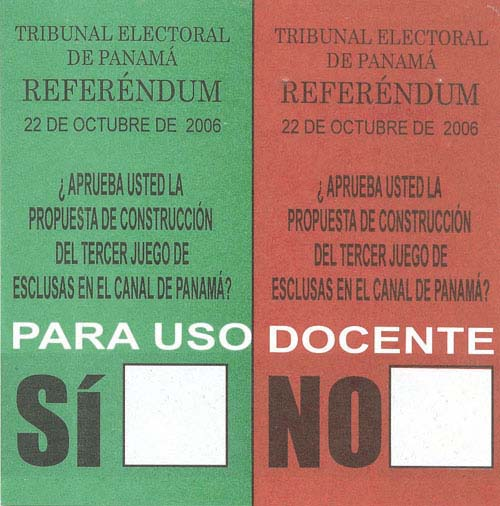
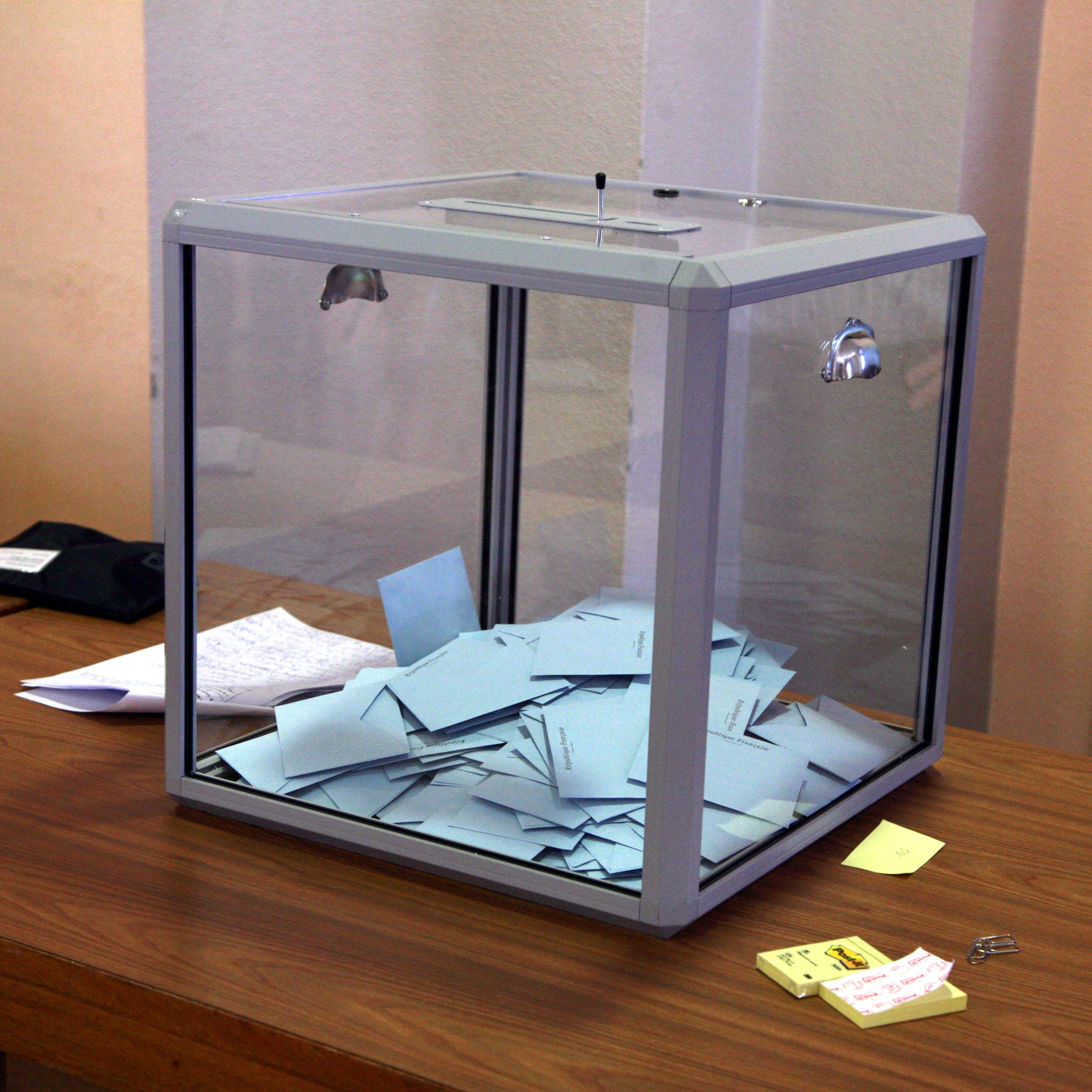
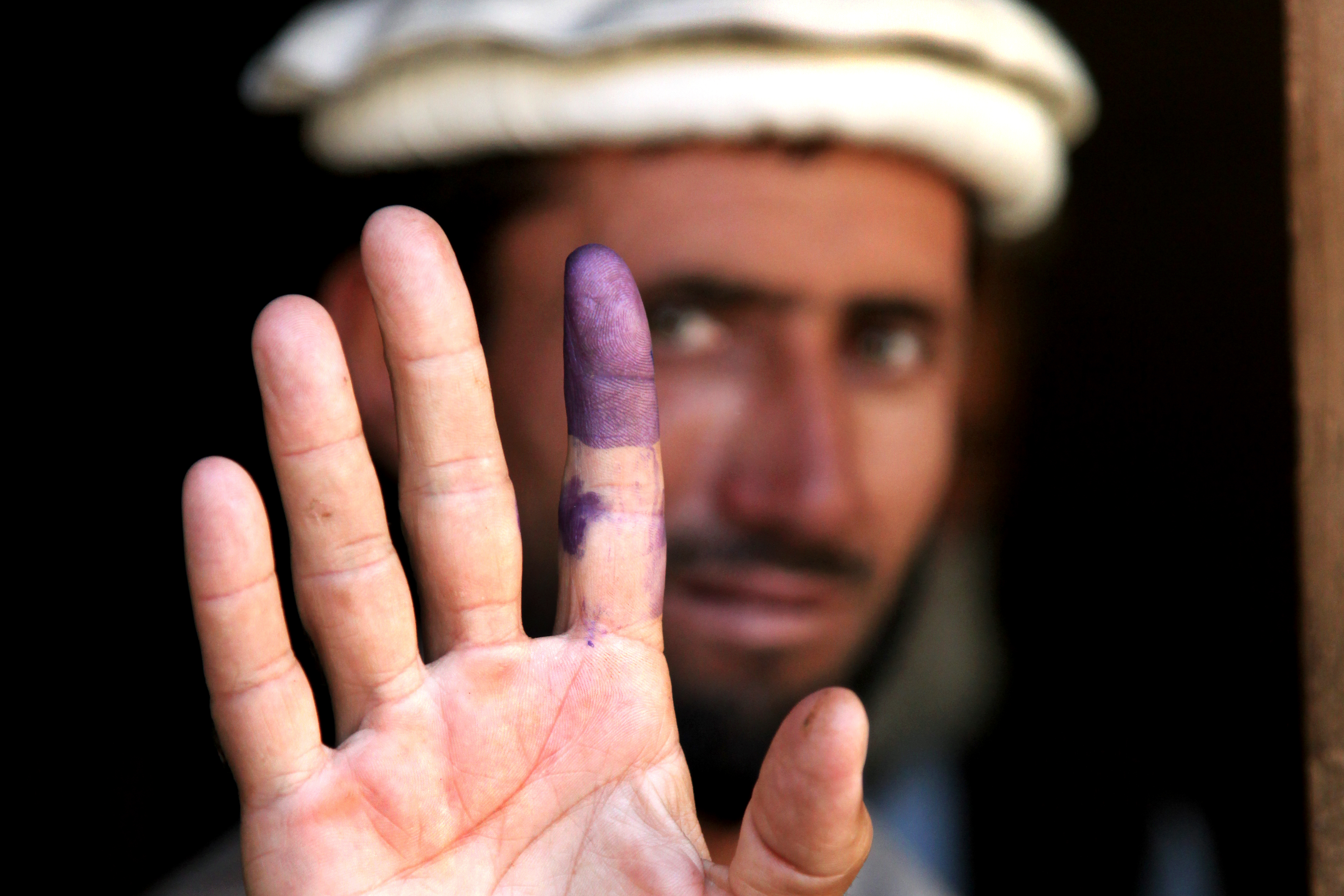
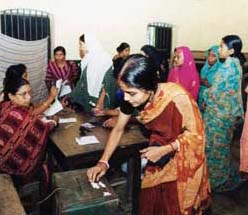
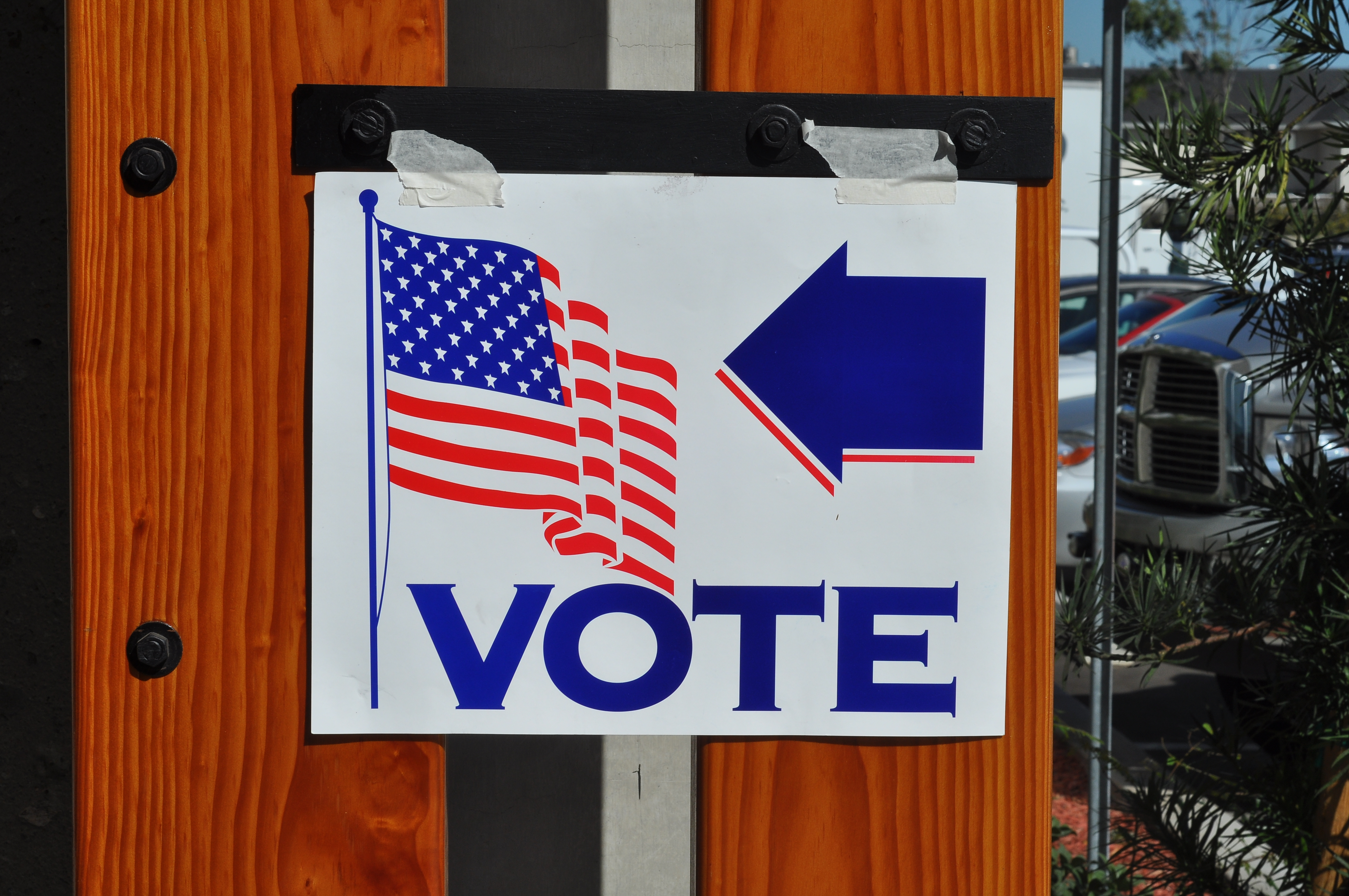
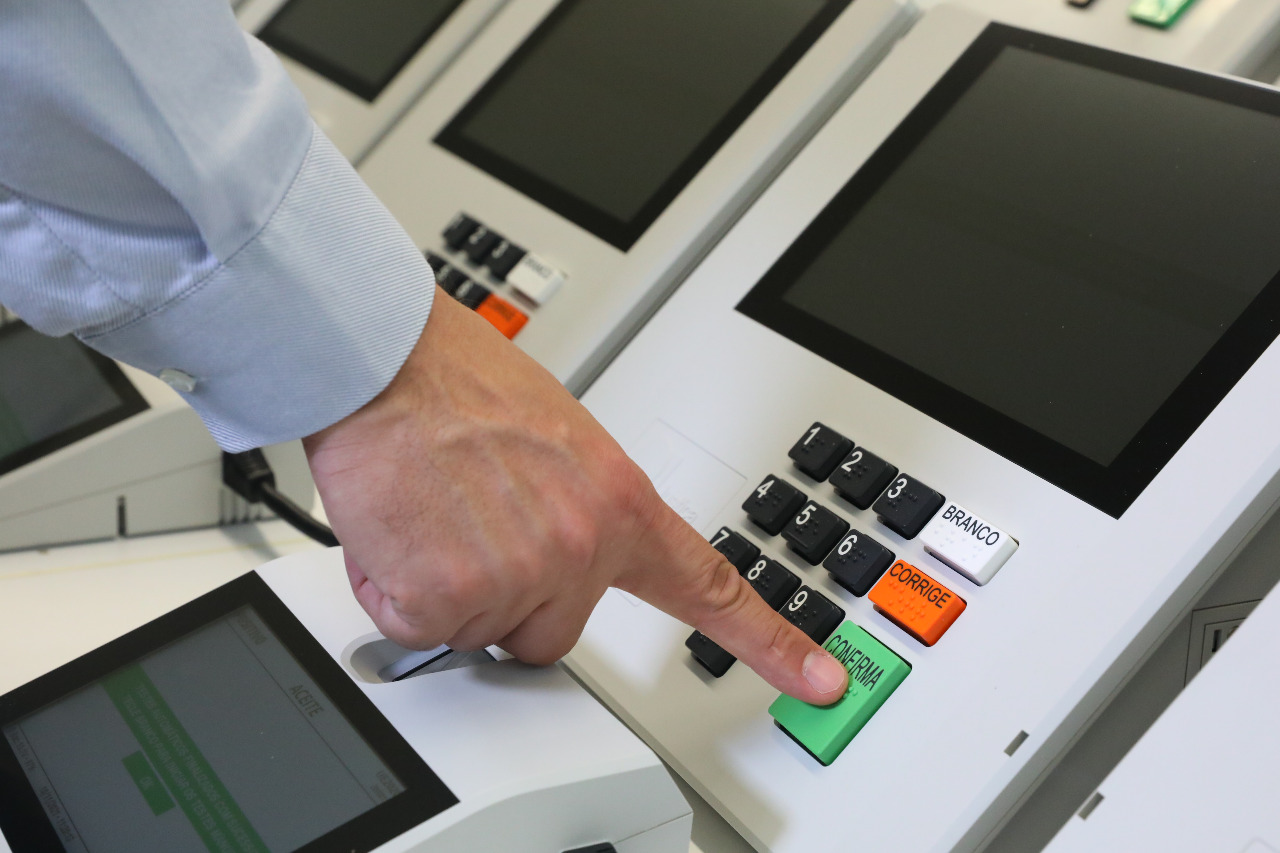
Clockwise from top left: ballot for a referendum in Panama, ballot box for a French election, women voting in Bangladesh, an electronic voting machine in Brazil, a sign at a United States voting location, election inking on a man's finger in Afghanistan

Voting is the process of making collective decisions by means of submitting and then adding up individual choices. The choice voted upon is often an election of a member or members to conduct political representation, but the object of a vote can be anything, for example what kind of food to buy or whether a defendant is innocent or guilty. Voting can be formal, using ballots and specific rules, or informal using raised hands, shouts (such as when the voice vote is used), or movement to indicate preference.

Recent work has clarified the definition of voting beyond the classic decision-making procedure description. Research on herd animal voting behaviours show that voting can be emergent in groups as a signalling system mechanism to pressure minorities to abandon their preference in favor of cohesion with a prevailing option. It has also been pointed out that the activity of voting closely resembles divination rituals and random chooser games such as drawing lots. The purpose of these community decision rituals is to generate social psychological acceptance, and to harmonize the group definition about what has happened. Descriptions of voting that ignore the social psychological components, and assume an invented rather than evolved origin, fail to adequately account for how voting works in practice.

Choosing one or more officials or representatives by casting an oral vote or a ballot, a document that formally expresses the preference or preferences of a voter (also known as a constituent) as to whom should be elected or whom the voter likes and thinks has best chance to be elected. Voting can also be used to decide on policy usually by a majority but sometimes a super-majority is required. In republics and representative democracies, a portion of the population votes to choose representative government members.

Electoral systems, the procedure for converting votes cast into winners, vary depending on both the country and the political office. In many countries organizations work to reform the election system, usually to make it fairer and ensure that as many votes as possible are used to elect the winners.

In organizations and non-government settings, voting may occur in different ways: formally via a paper vote to elect others for example within a workplace, to elect members of political associations, or to choose roles for others; or informally with a spoken agreement or a raised hand or other gesture. In larger organizations, like countries, voting is generally confined to periodic elections.

All modern liberal democracies use voting by secret ballot to prevent individuals from becoming influenced by other people and to protect their political privacy. The objective of secret ballots is to try to achieve the most authentic outcome, without any risk of pressure, threat, or services linked to one's vote; this way, a person is able to express their actual preferences.

Voting often takes place at a polling station but voting can also be done remotely by mail or using internet voting (such as in Estonia). Voting is voluntary in some countries, like the UK, but it may be required by law in others, such as Australia.

Different voting machinery may be used such as lever voting machines, paper-based scanning systems, computerized tabulators and electronic voting machines, with an impact on the manner in which the ballot may be presented to the voter. Some forms of technology was adopted to produce quicker voting results, especially when the long ballot is used as in some U.S. jurisdictions. Internet voting is a possibility in the future. Studies of voters have found that they notice—and sometimes object to—the manner in which they vote and the technology that they have to use to cast their vote. The large "blanket' ballots of some instances of ranked voting and the lack of transparency in some uses of voting technology are noted. Alongside the voter having seen their preferred candidate elected or not, they color the voter's level of satisfaction with the electoral system as a whole.

Recent developments combine voting with deliberative processes, resulting in Hybrid democratic innovations.

== Various types of ballots ==
Different voting systems use different ballot designs.

Ballots may be left blank for voter to write or mark their choice themselves; they might be printed by the party of choice; they might be printed and presented in balanced format giving each candidate equal space, with or without a space for the voter to cast a vote for a write-in candidate. The choice of different format may limit the secrecy of the cast vote. The use of mail-in ballots narrows the types of possible ballots.

Some ballots allow only one choice to be selected (single X voting); some ballots allow multiple choices to be selected (multiple X voting); some allow ranking of multiple options (ranked ballots), either to be used as back-up preferences or used in conjunction with the first preference.

Different voting systems allow each voter (also known as a constituent ) to cast a different number of votes - only one (single voting as in First-past-the-post voting, Single non-transferable voting and Single transferable voting); as many as are being elected in a multiple-member district (multiple voting as used in Plurality block voting); more than one but fewer than are being elected in a multiple-member district (Limited voting). Most allow a voter to put just one vote on each candidate, but cumulative voting allows a voter's votes to be piled on to one candidate.

With ranked voting, as used in instant-runoff voting system in some elections in Australia and the United States, and single transferable voting used in Ireland, Malta and other places, voters rank candidates in order of preference (1,2,3,4 etc.). At first, each vote is distributed to the candidate marked as the first preference. Later the vote may be transferred to a different candidate marked as a back-up preference. The vote is used for just one candidate at any one time (or split fractionally among multiple candidates but its fractions never adding up to more than one).

In the Quota Borda System (QBS), the voters also cast their preferences, 1,2,3,4... as they wish.

In a voting system that uses multiple votes (plurality block voting), the voter can vote for any subset of the running candidates. So, a voter might vote for Alice, Bob, and Charlie, rejecting Daniel and Emily. Approval voting uses such multiple votes.

In a voting system that uses a ranked vote, the voter ranks the candidates in order of preference. For example, they might mark a preference for Bob in the first place, then Emily, then Alice, then Daniel, and finally Charlie. Preferential voting systems, such as those used in Australia and Ireland, use a ranked vote.

In a voting system that uses a scored vote (or range vote), the voter gives each alternative a number between one and ten (the upper and lower bounds may vary). See cardinal voting systems.

Some multiple-winner systems such as the Single Non-Transferable Vote, SNTV, used in Afghanistan and Vanuatu give a single vote or one vote per elector even though multiple members are being elected in the district.

STV uses single ranked votes.

Block voting is often used when members of city councils are elected at-large.

Under cumulative voting, a voter casts multiple votes and can cast more than one vote for the same candidate.

The Condorcet rule is used (sometimes) in decision-making. The voters or elected representatives cast their preferences on one, some, or all options, 1,2,3,4... as in PR-STV or QBS.

== Voting methods ==
=== Paper-based methods ===
The most common voting method uses paper ballots on which a voter either places an X or marks their preferences as in ranked voting. This may involve marking their support for a candidate or party whose identification is printed on the ballot, or a write-in where they write out the name of their preferred candidate (if it is not listed).

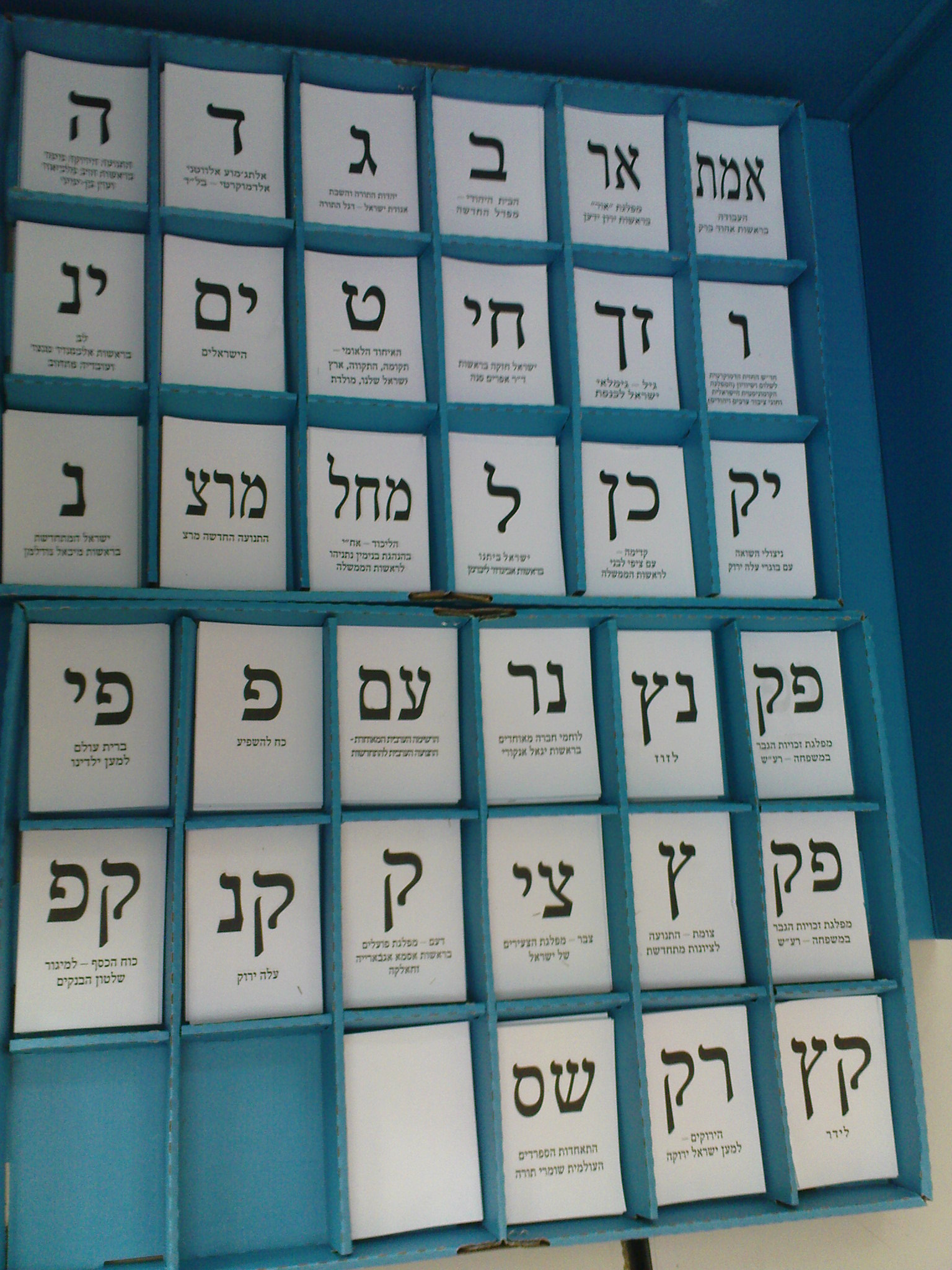
Ballot letters in Israel

An alternative method that is still paper-based known as ballot letters is used in Israel, where polling booths contain a tray with ballots for each party running in the elections; the ballots are marked with the letter(s) assigned to that party. Voters are given an envelope into which they put the ballot of the party they wish to vote for, before placing the envelope in the ballot box. The same system is also implemented in Latvia. The system is used commonly in open lists or primary elections, where voters must choose a single party whose candidates they are allowed to choose between.

In 19th century western Canada the "Oliver ballot" was used, where the voter was given a blank ballot and a range of colored pencils. He put a mark on the ballot with the pencil of the color of his preferred candidate.

=== Machine voting ===
Machine voting uses voting machines, which may be manual (e.g. lever machines) or electronic.

=== Online voting ===
Some countries allow people to vote online. Estonia was one of the first countries to use online voting: it was first used in their 2005 local elections.

=== Postal voting ===
Many countries allow postal voting, where voters are sent a ballot and return it by post.

=== Open ballot ===
In contrast to a secret ballot, an open ballot takes place in public and is commonly done by a show of hands. An example is the Landsgemeinde system in Switzerland, which is still in use in the cantons of Appenzell Innerrhoden, Glarus, Grisons, and Schwyz.

Some settings use shouts or spoken word to show the voter's sentiment. The voice vote is an example of such an open balloting.

=== Other methods ===
In Gambia, voting is carried out using marbles. The method was introduced in 1965 to deal with illiteracy. Polling stations contain metal drums painted in party colours and emblems with candidates' photos attached to them. Voters are given a marble to place in the drum of their chosen candidate; when dropped into the drum, a bell sounds to register the vote. To avoid confusion, bicycles are banned near polling booths on election day. If the marble is left on top of the drum rather than placed in it, the vote is deemed invalid.

A similar system used in social clubs sees voters given a white ball to indicate support and a black ball to indicate opposition. Secretly, each voter places the ball of choice into a receptacle, and then the resulting distribution of balls is counted at the end of the voting period, often with one black ball being enough to decide against the prospective member Thus was coined the term blackballing.

== Referendums ==
People can sometimes vote in referendums and initiatives. Since the end of the eighteenth century, more than five hundred national referendums (including initiatives) were held in the world. More than three hundred were held in Switzerland. Australia has also held dozens of referendums.

Most referendums are binary, a yes or no quetiton. The first multi-option referendum was held in New Zealand in 1894. Most multi-option referendums are conducted under a two-round system. New Zealand had a five-option referendum in 1992, while Guam had a six-option plebiscite in 1982, which also offered a blank option, for voters who wanted to (campaign and) vote for a seventh option.

Occasionally, referendums use an instant-runoff voting format, such as the 1923 Alberta prohibition plebiscite or the 2018 British Columbia electoral reform referendum.

== Proxy voting ==
Proxy voting is a form of voting in which a registered citizen who can legally vote passes on his or her vote to a different voter or electorate who will vote in his stead. This is sometimes confused with liquid democracy.

== Anti-voting ==
In South Africa, poor citizens have conducted anti-voting campaigns. They made the structural argument that no political party truly represented them. This resulted in the "No Land! No House! No Vote!" campaign, which was prominent each time the country held elections. The campaign was supported by three of South Africa's largest social movements: the Western Cape Anti-Eviction Campaign, Abahlali baseMjondolo, and the Landless Peoples Movement.

Other social movements in other parts of the world also have had similar campaigns or non-voting preferences. These include the Zapatista Army of National Liberation and various anarchist-oriented movements.

Some of those who are required to vote merely spoil their vote. Others make a blank vote, carrying out the act of voting, which may be compulsory, without selecting any candidate or option, often as an act of protest. In some jurisdictions, there is an official none of the above option and it is counted as a valid vote. Usually, blank and null votes are counted (together or separately) but are not considered valid.

== Voting and information ==
Modern political science has questioned whether average citizens have sufficient political knowledge to cast meaningful votes. A series of studies coming out of the University of Michigan in the 1950s and 1960s argued that many voters lack a basic understanding of current issues, the liberal–conservative ideological dimension, and the relative ideological dilemma that are important to understand when making political decisions. Studies from other institutions have suggested that the physical appearance of candidates is a criterion upon which voters base their decision. Voting advice applications can increase political knowledge enabling to cast informed votes.

== Religious views ==
Christadelphians, Jehovah's Witnesses, Old Order Amish, the Assemblies of Yahweh, Rastafarians and some other religious groups, have a policy of not participating in politics and this extends to voting.

Rabbis from all Jewish denominations encourage voting and some even consider it a religious obligation. The Catholic Church teaches that it is morally obligatory to vote.

== Meetings and gatherings ==
Whenever several people who do not all agree need to make some decision, voting and a form of election is a common way of reaching a decision peacefully. The right to vote is usually restricted to certain people. Members of a society or club, or shareholders of a company, but not outsiders, may elect its officers, or adopt or change its rules, in a similar way to the election of people to official positions. A panel of judges, either formal judicial authorities or judges of the competition, may decide by voting. A group of friends or members of a family may decide which film to see by voting. The method of voting can range from formal submission of written votes, through show of hands, voice voting or audience response systems, to informal noting which outcome seems to be preferred by more people.

=== In deliberative assemblies ===
Some votes are carried out in person if all the people eligible to vote are present. This could be by a show of hands or keypad polling.

Deliberative assemblies—bodies that use parliamentary procedure to arrive at decisions—use several methods when voting on motions (formal proposals by a member or members of a deliberative assembly). The regular methods of voting in such bodies are a voice vote, a rising vote, and a show of hands. Additional forms of voting include a recorded vote and balloting. The assembly can decide on the voting method by adopting a motion on it.

== Women's suffrage ==
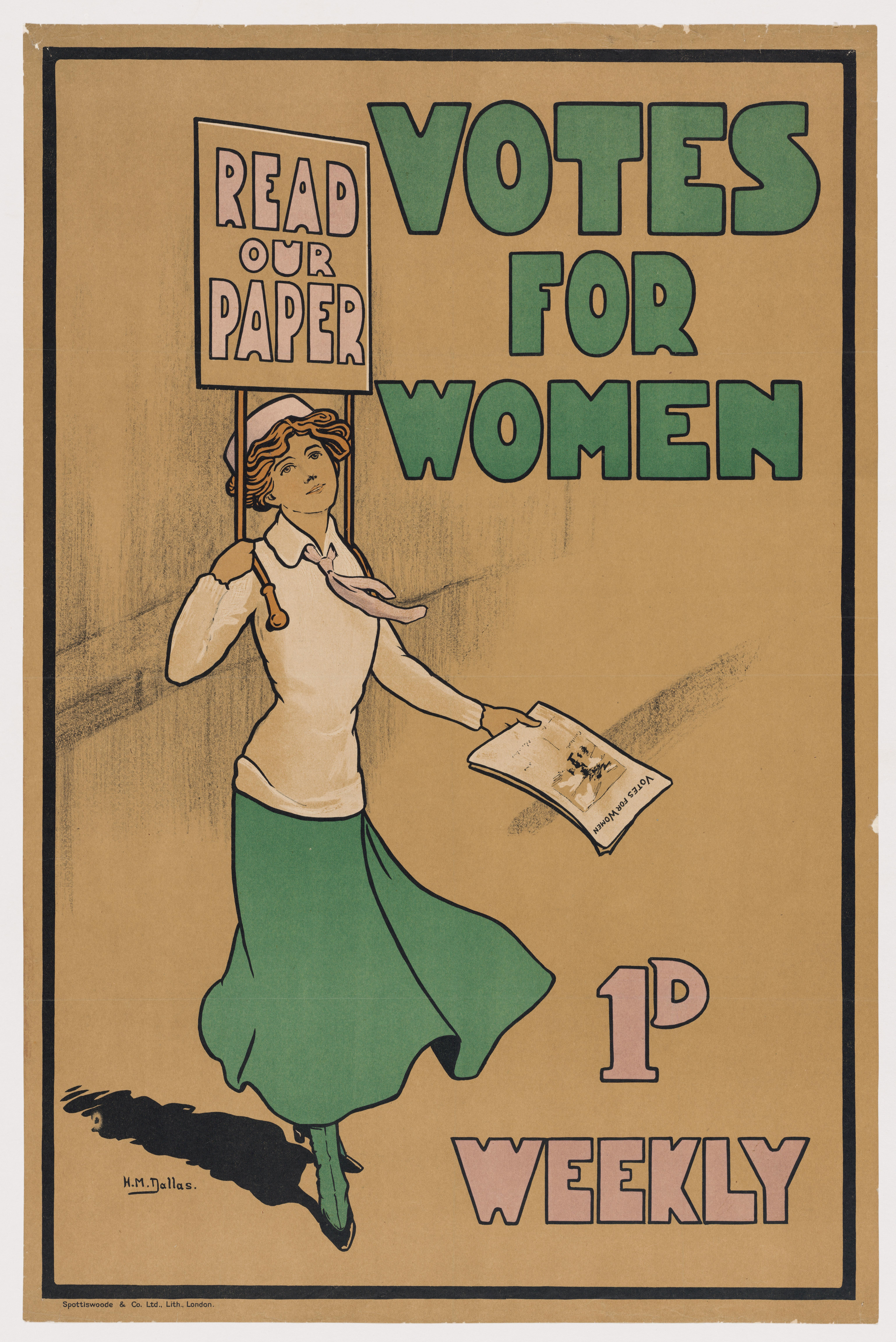
Suffrage poster, 1920

Universal suffrage for women

Women's suffrage is the right of women to vote in elections. Historically, women rarely had the right to vote, even in ostensibly democratic systems of government. The 19th century saw many movements advocating "universal [male] suffrage", most notably in Europe and North America; following this, movements for women's suffrage became prominent, and between the late 19th century and the early 20th century, women's suffrage was accomplished in Australasia, then Europe, and then the Americas. By the middle of the 20th century, women's suffrage had been established as a norm of democratic governance. Extended political campaigns by women and their male supporters played a central role in changing public attitudes, altering norms, and achieving legislation or constitutional amendments for women's suffrage.

The first wave of women's suffrage took place in 1893–1930, covering English-speaking countries, Scandinavian states, and some other parts of Europe. The experience of the First World War has been characterized as an important factor in shifting public support for women's suffrage. The second wave, 1930–1970, covered nearly all Latin American countries, much of Sub-Saharan Africa and the remaining European states (France, Spain, Belgium).

Prior to 1893, there were instances where women could vote in some elections and at the subnational level. The first national granting of women's suffrage was in 1893 in the then self-governing British colony of New Zealand. National and international organizations formed to coordinate efforts towards women voting, especially the International Woman Suffrage Alliance (founded in 1904 in Berlin, Germany). Most major Western powers extended voting rights to women by the interwar period, including Canada (1917), Germany (1918), Austria, the Netherlands (1919), the United States (1920) and the United Kingdom (1928). Notable exceptions in Europe were France, where women could not vote until 1944, Greece (equal voting rights for women did not exist there until 1952, although, since 1930, literate women were able to vote in local elections), and Switzerland (where, since 1971, women could vote at the federal level, and between 1959 and 1990, women gained the right to vote at the local canton level).

In many countries, limited suffrage for women was granted before universal suffrage for men; for instance, literate women or property owners were granted suffrage before all men received it. The United Nations encouraged women's suffrage in the years following World War II, and the Convention on the Elimination of All Forms of Discrimination Against Women (1979) identifies it as a basic right with 189 countries currently being parties to this convention.

== See also ==
- Ranked voting
- Vote splitting
- Voter turnout
- Voting age
- Voting bloc
- Voting methods in deliberative assemblies
- Voting system
- Class voting
- Cosmopolitan democracy
- Demeny voting
- Democratic mundialization
- Dollar voting
- Electoral fraud
- Electoral system
- Ranked voting systems
- Gerrymandering
- Hybrid democratic innovation
- List of suffragists and suffragettes
- Mandate (politics)
- Opinion poll
- Political base
- Presidential election
- Proportional representation
- Psephology
- Redistricting
- Referendum
- Right of expatriates to vote in their country of origin
- Right to candidacy
- Single transferable vote
- Suffrage
- Suffragette
- Timeline of women's suffrage
- Universal suffrage
- Political expressive behaviour
