= G0v movement =

Open government model

The g0v movement, or g0v, (pronounced gov-zero /ɡʌvziroʊ/) is an open source, open government collaboration started by Chia-liang Kao ("clkao"), ipa, kirby and others in late 2012 in Taiwan.

Originally driven by a bimonthly hackathon, the community has expanded to include different professional and non-information technology background members. Symbolizing the community's efforts to "rethink the role of government from zero," and borrowing the parlance of binary from the digital world of 1s and 0s, the O in "gov" is replaced with a 0 to make "g0v"; for many government agencies in Taiwan which have URLs ending .gov.tw, replacing .gov with .g0v redirects the user to the so-called shadow government, a "forked" version of that agency with contributions by civic hackers. Continuing this inspiration from the software development world, the forked content can then be "merged" back into the government agency's website.

g0v is a community that promotes the transparency of government information and is committed to developing information platforms and tools for citizens to participate in society. As of the beginning of 2014, there have been contributors across three continents, and the results have been released in a free software model that embraces knowledge sharing.

== Origin ==
=== The "Real Price" Incident ===
Amidst popular unrest regarding speculative housing inflation, Taiwanese President Ma Ying-jeou made housing justice a key component of his 2012 re-election platform. In an attempt to counter speculation and enable fair taxation, the parliament passed a bipartisan bill mandating that all real estate transactions register the actual price.

As part of the mandate, the Ministry of the Interior commissioned a website on which people can find transaction records by street address. The site went live on October 16 to a flood of requests and remained only intermittently accessible for most of October.

Three days after the launch, a team of four Google.tw engineers incorporated the Ministry's data into their Real-Price Maps website, overlaying aggregated pricing information on Google Maps with a plethora of filtering features. Their remix was well-received, successfully serving hundreds of requests per second from Google App Engine.

A week later, Minister without portfolio Simon Chang (a Google alum himself) invited the remixers to a round table. The team responded amiably, offering detailed suggestions about how they would like to collaborate with the government.

However, after media coverage pitted the team's shoestring budget of NTD$500 against the official site's “million-dollar disaster”, the relationship between the two soon turned sour. The Ministry claimed the crawling activity contributed to their server's downtime, while critics of the engineers' overlay questioned the legality of scraping and remixing government data.

The incident came to a head on November 14, when the official site replaced all street addresses with image files, dramatically increasing the burden of crawling. Despite the fact that a civic hacker eventually published parsed data using OCR techniques, the Real-Price Maps site closed shortly thereafter.

=== "Power-Up Plan for the Economy" ===
While the Real Price incident was still unfolding, a new government production took the spotlight: A 40-second video advertisement titled “What's the Economy Power-Up Plan?”

Critics found the advertisement, "Entirely devoid of information, the clip simply repeated the following monotonous refrain: 'We have a very complex plan. It is too complicated to explain. Never mind the details — just follow instructions and go along with it!'"

The video faced criticism from the public, but went viral; many viewers on YouTube protested the advertisement by clicking “report abuse" on the video. The automated system quickly classified the video as spam and banned the government's YouTube account for two days.

The video went on-air again on October 19, just before Yahoo! Open Hack Day 2012, an annual 24-hour event in which 64 teams demonstrate innovative creations. Infuriated by the controversial ad, the four members of the “Hacker #15” team made a last-minute pivot from their “online window shopping” project. Rather than displaying merchandise, they resolved to create a bird's-eye view of how taxes are spent.

The resulting Budget Maps project presented each agency's annual spending in the form of geometric shapes of proportional sizes, inviting participants to review and rate each item's usefulness. Calling upon citizens to “strike out rip-off spending (e.g. the Power-Up ad)”, the two-minute demo won NTD$50,000 in Hack Day prizes.

In an attempt to bolster interest in this and future projects past the demonstration day, team member CL Kao registered the domain name g0v.tw, dedicated to citizens’ remixes of government websites. The Real-Price Maps thus became accessible at lvr.land.moi.g0v.tw before its shutdown, with only one ASCII character of difference from its official counterpart at lvr.land.moi.gov.tw; meanwhile, the Budget Maps lived on at budget.g0v.tw as the inaugural g0v.tw project.

=== Hackath0n ===
Equipped with the new g0v.tw domain, the four hackers agreed to spend the NTD$50k prize on their own hackathon to enlist more projects into the syndicate of civic remixes. Modeled after participant-driven BarCamp events, they named the event 0th Hackathon of Martial Mobilization, or Hackath0n, invoking a rebellious image from Taiwan's 1949-era civil war.

Registrants soon exceeded the initial venue's capacity. A lab director at Academia Sinica offered to host the event at the Institute of Information Science. On December 1, civic hackers filled the institute's 80-person auditorium and presented their projects, covering a wide range of government functions, including Congress, Tenders, Geography, Weather, Electricity, Healthcare and many other areas. Discussion continued online at Hackpad and IRC well after the daylong event.

In support of the coding efforts, writers and bloggers formed a Facebook group offering on-demand copywriting skills to any project that asked for assistance. Designer Even Wu also initiated an on-demand design group, providing hackers with various visual assets.

Dissatisfied with the makeshift logo banner, Wu would continue to work on several iterations of the logotypes, eventually completing a set of Visual Identity guidelines aimed at helping elevate g0v into an easily recognizable brand.

== Declaration ==
g0v states, "[We] have demonstrated a way to combine online and offline activism. Following the model established by the Free Software community over the past two decades, we transformed social media into a platform for social production, with a fully open and decentralized cultural & technological framework."

g0v summarizes its collaborative governance philosophy thus: "Ask not why nobody is doing this. You are the 'nobody'!"

== Activities and projects ==
g0v community activities are both online and offline, including hackathons, speeches, sharing sessions, teaching, conference, and other activities. As of 2020 there are active g0v communities working on open government data in Taiwan and Hong Kong.

=== g0v.tw projects ===
Prominent applications and widgets created by g0v include:

- MoeDict, a digital Chinese dictionary developed by Audrey Tang
  - AmisDict, an Amis-Chinese dictionary
- Cofacts, a collaborative fact-checking bot
- Disfactory, a website for reporting illegal factories on farmland
- vTaiwan, an online-offline open consultation process, used to shape national legislation
- Airmap, an open source website and companion hardware projects for crowdsourcing air pollution data

=== g0vhk ===
The Hong Kong branch of g0v, known as g0vhk, was founded in 2016 by data scientist Ho Wa Wong. The g0v movement gained popularity in Hong Kong due to their work in aggregating candidate information in the 2019 Hong Kong local elections and disseminating disease prevention news during the 2019-20 coronavirus pandemic.

Prominent gadgets produced by the g0vhk community have included:

- Hong Kong Address Parser
- Vote 4 Hong Kong (data aggregation for the 2019 and 2020 general elections)
- Covid-19 in HK dashboard

=== g0v.it ===
The Italian branch of g0v was founded in 2019 by the Copernicani NPO.

The projects are listed on their website.

== See also ==
- e-participation
- Open government
- Pol.is
- Radical transparency
- Sunflower Movement
