= Bruno Stefanini =

Swiss art collector (1924–2018)

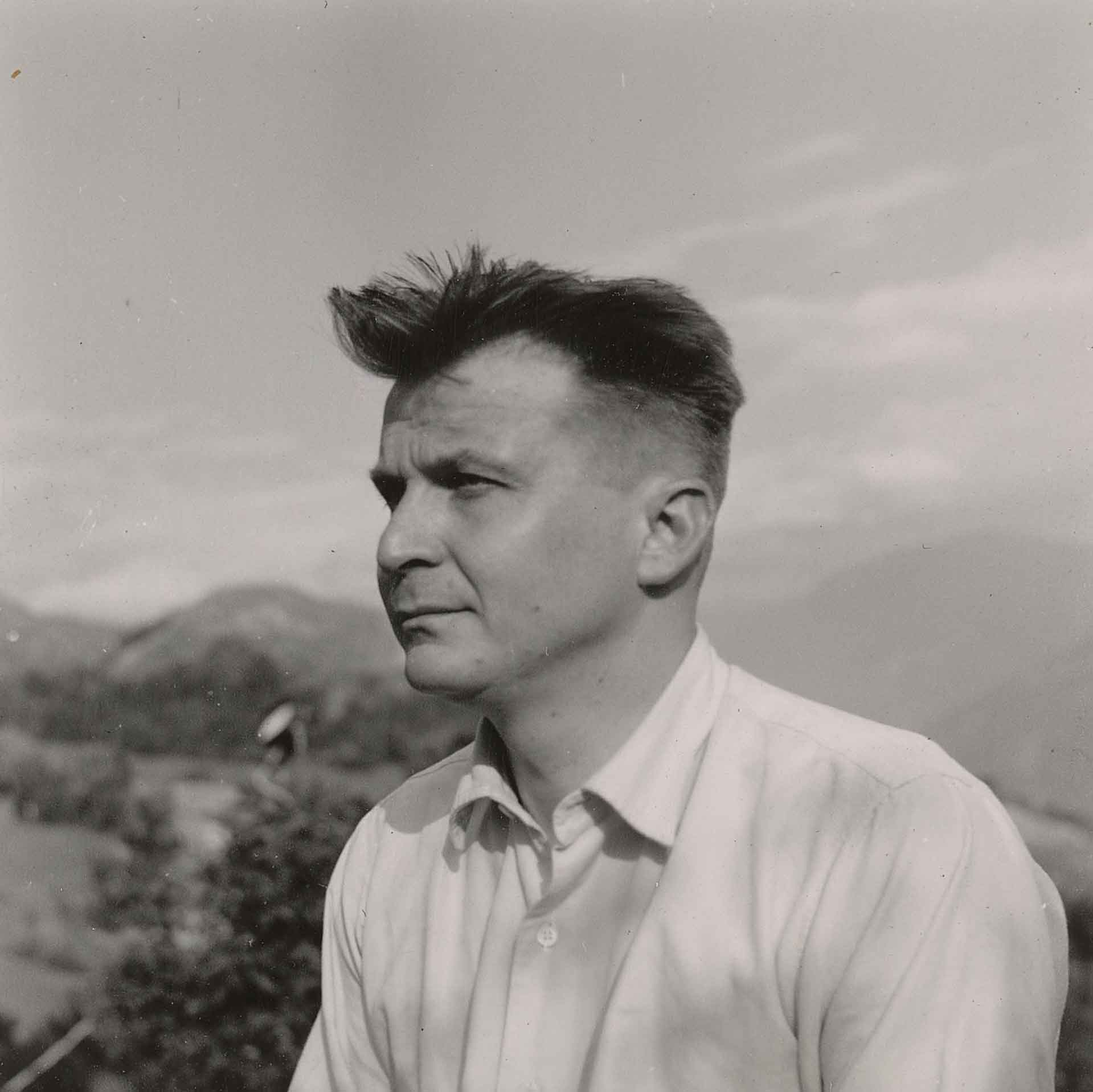
- Bruno Stefanini (1950)
- Born: Bruno Stefanini; 5 August 1924; Winterthur, Switzerland
- Died: 14 December 2018 (aged 94); Winterthur, Switzerland
- Citizenship: Swiss
- Education: ETH Zurich (did not graduate)
- Occupations: Real estate investor, art collector
- Spouse: Veronika Winiger (m. 1961; div. 1971)
- Partner: Dora Bösiger (1970s–2018)
- Children: 3

Bruno Stefanini (5 August 1924 – 14 December 2018) was a Swiss businessman, real estate investor and art collector. His net worth was estimated at almost 1 billion Swiss Francs by Handelszeitung.

== Early life and education ==
Stefanini was born on 5 August 1924, the second of two children, to Giuseppe Antonio Stefanini (1894–1973), an innkeeper, and Elisabeth Katharina Stefanini (née Hüppi; 1894–1983), into a Catholic family. He had an older brother, Aldo Stefanini (born 1921).

His father, Giuseppe, was originally from Italy and was naturalized as Swiss citizen living in Winterthur in 1928. His mother originally hailed from Glarus, Switzerland, but was primarily raised in Alsace. In 1930, Giuseppe and Katharina took over the working-class restaurant Zum Salmen which was owned by an Italian workers cooperative. Giuseppe served as the president of the cooperative between 1935 and 1965. Through his role, he received the first right of refusal to off-market real estate deals, which enabled him to acquire 18 apartments and create modest affluence.

His teacher did not recommend him to complete the Matura, mainly due to his working class background. He completed his Matura and passed the entry exam to ETH Zurich, where he studied for several semesters but did not graduate. He abandoned his plans to graduate with a degree in natural sciences to pursue real estate full-time.

== Career ==
=== Real estate ===
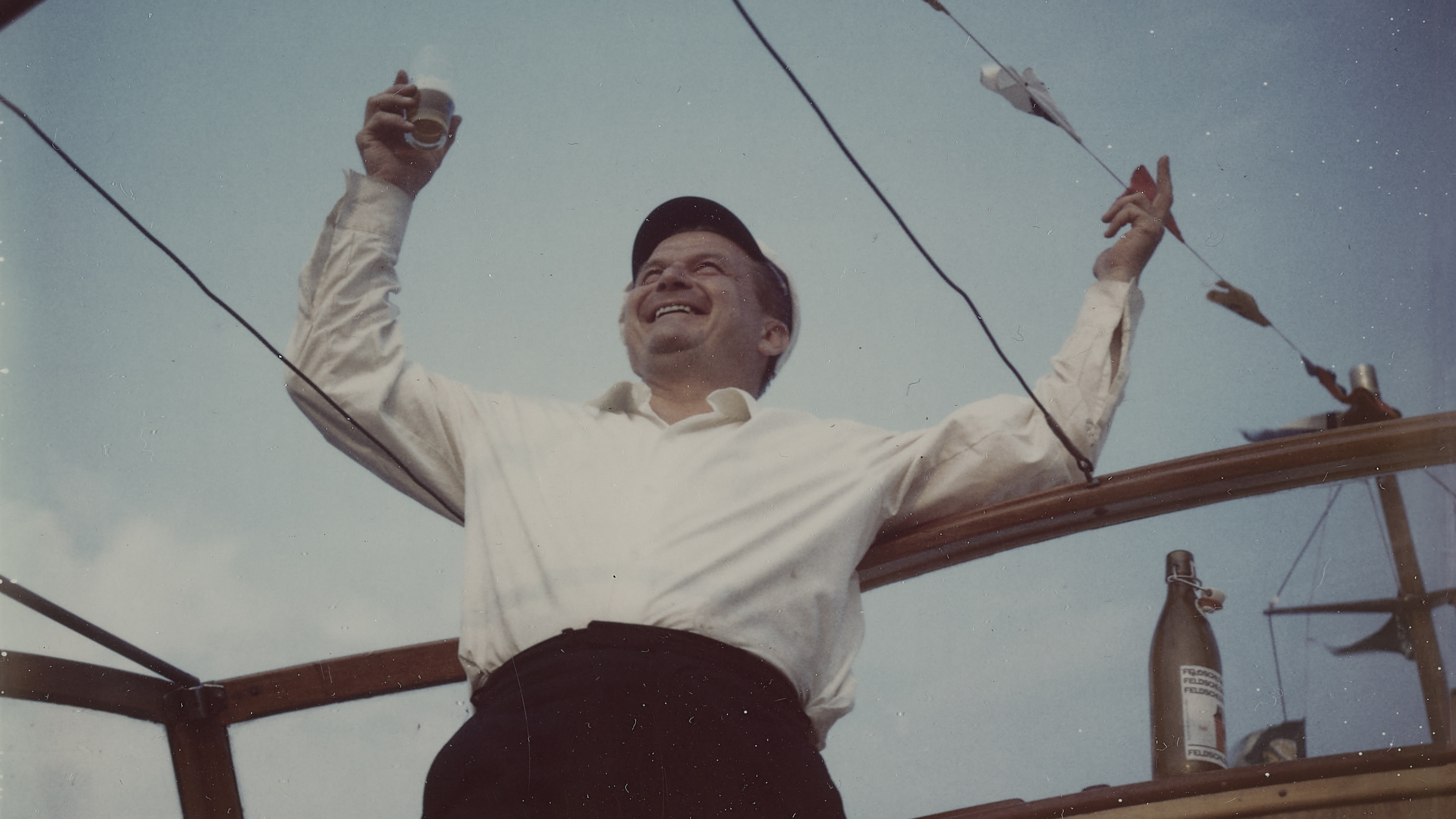
Bruno Stefanini, 1980 on his boat

Stefanini owned many properties in the city, including part of Steinberggasse in Winterthur's old town. He also owned the Sulzer high-rise building.. In 2009, the city had two properties on Steinberggasse scaffolded because of danger to passers-by. His castles, including Salenstein Castle, also fell into disrepair, leading to media reports.

Stefanini owned an estimated 280 properties in Switzerland. His personal history was considered somewhat mysterious and excited interest. He had transferred most of his assets to his foundation, which he set up in 1980.

=== Foundation for Art, Culture and History ===
Stefanini invested a large part of his fortune in art. In 2023, the New York Times estimated his collection at more than 100,000 pieces, including 6,000 oil paintings. His Foundation for Art, Culture and History (Stiftung für Kunst, Kultur und Geschichte or SKKG) is one of the most important private art collections in Switzerland, in addition to possessing four castles and various curiosities. Artworks include works by Ferdinand Hodler, Albert Anker, Giovanni Giacometti, Alberto Giacometti, Giovanni Segantini, Felix Vallotton, Angelika Kauffmann, Ottilie Roederstein, Alice Bailly, Helen Dahm, Meret Oppenheim and Niki de Saint Phalle. The four castles of Grandson on Lake Neuchâtel, Luxburg and Salenstein in Thurgau, and Brestenberg in Aargau also belong to the foundation.

Stefanini owed many unique items and curiosities, including the Rolls-Royce von Joe Carstairs, the death bed and will of Napoleon Bonaparte, an officer cap, coat, dagger and pocket watch von General Guisan, and a dress of Kaiserin «Sisi». Only a small part of this collection is open to the public. The value of the entire collection is estimated at over 1.5 billion Swiss francs, the objects at approximately 34,000 pieces.

Considered media-shy, Stefanini's last public appearance took place in March 2014 at a vernissage of the Kunstmuseum Bern. In 2016, the historian Miguel Garcia published a biography in German entitled: Bruno Stefanini: Ein Jäger und Sammler mit hohen Idealen.

=== Legacy ===
On 17 December 2014, the foundation was the object of a dispute. The descendants Bettina and Vital Stefanini appointed a new board of trustees before the expiry of the term of office of the board of trustees elected by founder Bruno Stefanini, prompting the intervention of the supervisory authority. The Swiss Federal Supervisory Authority for Foundations reversed the step taken by the descendants and reinstated the board of trustees elected by the founder. In an order dated 30 January 2015, the Federal Supervisory Authority for Foundations appointed the Bernese lawyer Stephan Herren as administrator. In March 2018, the Federal Supreme Court ruled in favour of Bruno Stefanini's children, the Federal Supervisory Authority for Foundations terminated the mandate of the trustee, and daughter Bettina Stefanini took over the presidency of the foundation board. She had returned to Winterthur from Ireland in 2018 to "represent the interests of my father, who suffers from dementia, and his foundation." The previous members of the foundation board had to step down.

=== Provenance research project ===
In 2023, the Foundation announced a provenance research project to examine the collection for looted art. In May 2026, following a claim and research, the SKKG Foundation in Winterthur restituted the painting "Lake Thun with Blüemlisalp and Niesen" by Ferdinand Hodler to the heirs of the Jewish art collector Martha Adrianna Nathan, née Dreyfus (1874-1958) and Hugo Nathan.

== Personal life ==
In 1961, Stefanini married Veronika Winiger (born 1934), with whom he had three children.

- Christoph Adrian Stefanini (1962–1988), committed suicide after a dispute over career plans with his father, died aged 26.
- Dr. Bettina Stefanini (born 1965)
- Vital Stefanini (born 1969)

The Stefanini family initially lived in a modest apartment in Veltheim, Aargau, which became too small for the growing family in 1969. Between 1969–1971, the family resided in a dilapidated mansion on Rychenberg in Winterthur, which Stefanini planned to renovate. However, his marriage ended in divorce and his former wife and children relocated to Bern.

He was known for being extremely modest, frugal, and media shy. He was also a hoarder who continually allowed his real estate holdings to fall into disrepair. In the Swiss Armed Forces, Stefanini held the rank of Captain.

Stefanini died 14 December 2018 in Winterthur aged 94 after a long battle with Alzheimer's disease.

== Literature ==
- Miguel Garcia: Bruno Stefanini. Ein Jäger und Sammler mit hohen Idealen. Verlag Neue Zürcher Zeitung, Zürich 2016, ISBN 978-3-03810-146-8.
- Bruno Stefanini im Winterthur Glossar.
