= John Dryzek =

Political scientist and university professor

John S. Dryzek
- Born: 23 June 1953 (age 73); Maids Moreton, England
- Education: University of Maryland
- Awards: Australian Laureate Fellowship (2014)
- Scientific career
- Fields: Social Theory and Political Theory
- Workplaces: University of Canberra, Australian National University

John S. Dryzek (born 23 June 1953) is a Centenary Professor at the Centre for Deliberative Democracy and Global Governance at the University of Canberra's Institute for Governance and Policy Analysis.

== Education ==
Dryzek has a B.A. (Honours) in Economics and Politics from the University of Lancaster (1974), an M.Sc. in Politics from the University of Strathclyde (1976) and a Ph.D. in Government and Politics from the University of Maryland (1980).

== Career ==
Before moving to the University of Canberra (Australia), Dryzek was Distinguished Professor of Political Science and Australian Research Council Federation Fellow at the Australian National University. He is a Fellow of the Academy of Social Sciences in Australia, former Head of the Departments of Political Science at the Universities of Oregon and Melbourne and of the Social and Political Theory program at the Australian National University (ANU), and former editor of the Australian Journal of Political Science.

Dryzek was a co-founder of the Earth System Governance Project in 2009.

In a 2010 poll of American political theorists, Dryzek was listed in the top 20 ‘scholars doing excellent work today whose work will be influential during the next 20 years’, and was the most highly ranked scholar based outside North America.

In 2014, Dryzek was awarded the Australian Research Council Laureate Fellowship for the project Deliberative worlds: democracy, justice and a changing world.

Working in both political theory and empirical social science, Dryzek is best known for his contributions in the areas of democratic theory and practice and environmental politics. One of the instigators of the 'deliberative turn' in democratic theory, he has published numerous books in this area with Oxford University Press, Cambridge University Press, and Polity Press. His work in environmental politics ranges from green political philosophy to studies of environmental discourses and movements to global climate governance, and he has published five books in this area with Oxford University Press, Cambridge University Press, and Basil Blackwell.

Dryzek has also worked on comparative studies of democratization, post-positivist public policy analysis, and the history and philosophy of social science. His current research emphasizes global justice, governance in the Anthropocene (where human activity is understood as a major environmental factor), and cultural variety in deliberative practice.

Dryzek has also been influential in the related fields of international relations and international political theory. He was an early proponent of global democracy, helping to develop the concept and illustrating why the exercise of power beyond the nation-state requires democratization. Drawing on his work in deliberative (or discursive) democracy, Dryzek has depicted how contending discourses operate in world politics and the space this opens for reflexivity and democratization. Also in line with previous work, Dryzek has highlighted how highly complex issue areas - notably climate governance - can be democratized through deliberation and public reason. Drawing from his work on deliberation and public reason, Dryzek has argued that many critiques of deliberative democracy can be addressed through greater discursive representation. More generally, Dryzek has undertaken discipline-leading work on global civil society, non-state actors, and representation in world politics.

== Bibliography ==
- Dryzek, John S. (1983). Conflict And Choice In Resource Management. The Case Of Alaska. Westview Press, Boulder CO: B. Blackwell.
- Dryzek, John S. (1987). Rational ecology: environment and political economy. Oxford, Oxfordshire UK New York, New York USA: B. Blackwell.
- Dryzek, John S. (1990). Discursive democracy: Politics, Policy, and Political Science. Cambridge: Cambridge University Press.
- Dryzek, John S. (1990). Discursive democracy: Politics, policy, and political science. Oxford, Oxfordshire UK New York, New York USA: Cambridge: Cambridge University Press.
- Dryzek, John S. (1996). Democracy in capitalist times: ideals, limits, and struggles. New York: Oxford University Press. ISBN 9780195106008.
- Dryzek, John S. (2005). The politics of the earth: environmental discourses (2nd ed.). Oxford New York: Oxford University Press. ISBN 9780199277391.
- Dryzek, John S. (2000). Deliberative democracy and beyond: liberals, critics, contestations. Oxford New York: Oxford University Press. ISBN 9780199250431.
- Dryzek, John S.; Phillips, Anne; Bonnie, Honig (2008). The Oxford handbook of political theory. Oxford: Oxford University Press. ISBN 9780199548439.
- Dryzek, John S.; Dunleavy, Patrick (2009). Theories of the democratic state. Basingstoke, Hampshire New York: Palgrave Macmillan. ISBN 9780230542860.
- Dryzek, John S.; Norgaard, Richard B.; Schlosberg, David, eds. (2011). The Oxford Handbook of Climate Change and Society. Oxford University Press. pp. 153, 159. ISBN 978-0199566600.
