= Young Pirates =

Young Pirates are youth wings of Pirate Parties. The term may relate to:

- Young Pirates of Europe
- Young Pirate, Sweden
- Young Pirates (Czech Republic)
- Young Pirates (Germany)
