= Felix Reda =

German researcher and politician (born 1986)

Felix Reda MEP
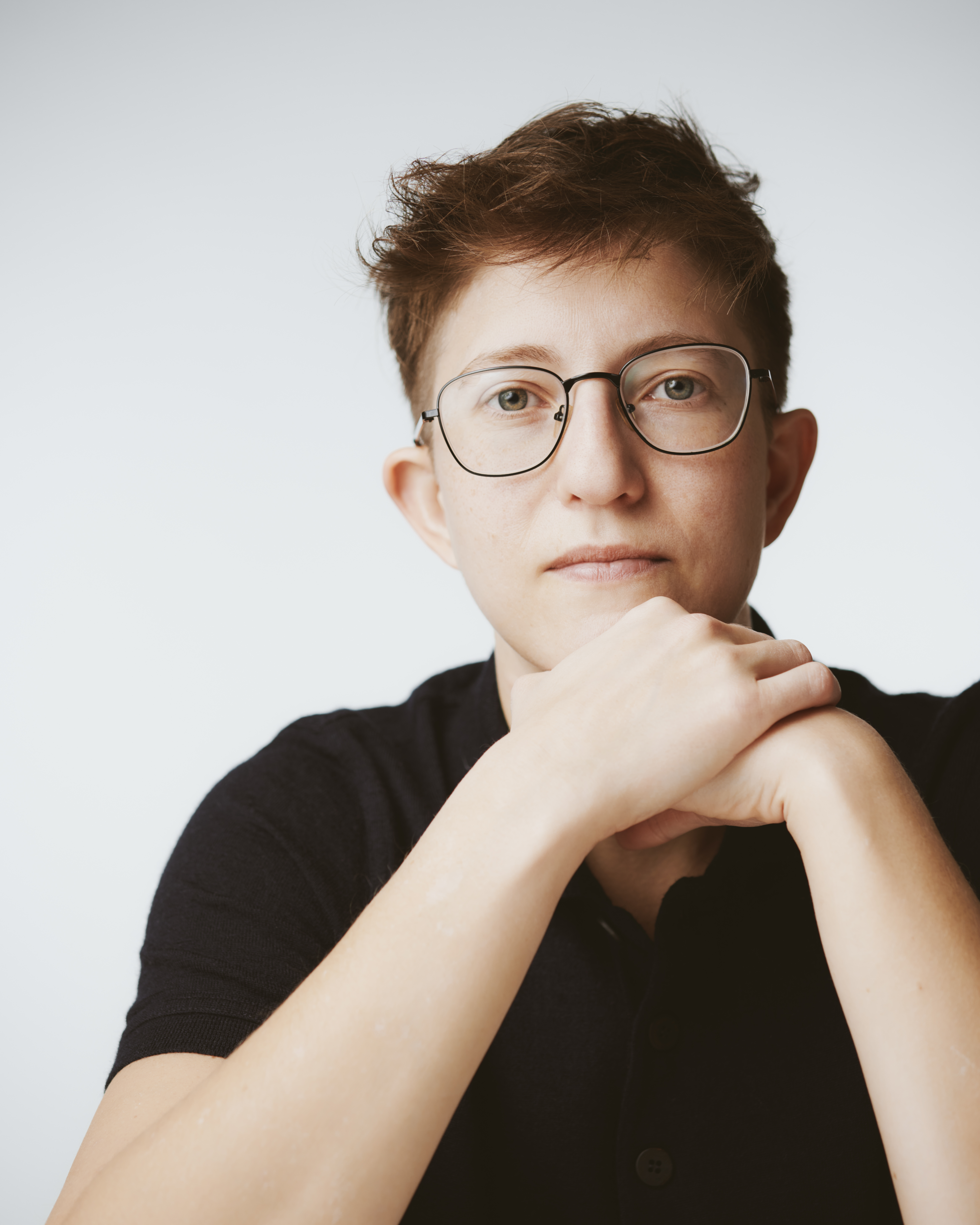

Vice President of The Greens–European Free Alliance
- In office 10 July 2014 – 1 July 2019
- Preceded by: Office Established

Member of the European Parliament
- In office 1 July 2014 – 1 July 2019
- Constituency: Germany

Personal details
- Born: 30 November 1986 (age 39) Bonn, West Germany
- Party: Independent; The Greens–European Free Alliance
- Other political affiliations: Pirate Party Germany (until 2019)
- Education: University of Mainz
- Website: felixreda.eu/en/
- Felix Reda introducing himself recorded January 2022

Felix Reda (formerly Julia Reda; born 30 November 1986) is a German researcher, politician, and former Member of the European Parliament (MEP) from Germany. He was a member of the Pirate Party Germany until 27 March 2019, part of The Greens–European Free Alliance. He has been vice-president of the Greens/EFA group since 2014. He was also previously the president of Young Pirates of Europe. After the 2019 European Parliament election, Reda was succeeded by Patrick Breyer (Pirate Party Germany), Marcel Kolaja, Markéta Gregorová, and Mikuláš Peksa (Czech Pirate Party).

In 2019, Reda became a fellow at the Berkman Klein Center for Internet & Society at Harvard. In 2020, he began working for the Gesellschaft für Freiheitsrechte (GFF, 'Society for Civil Rights'), as expert for copyright and freedom of communication.

Since March 2024, Reda works for Microsoft GitHub.

== Political career ==
Reda became a member of the centre-left Social Democratic Party of Germany when he was 16 years old. He studied politics and publicity sciences at the University of Mainz. In 2009, Reda started to become active for the national Pirate Party and from 2010 to 2012 he was chairperson of the Young Pirates (Junge Piraten). In 2013, he was one of the co-founders of the Young Pirates of Europe. In January 2014, he was chosen to top the list of the candidates for the European Elections for the Pirate Party Germany, who subsequently won one seat.

In the European Parliament, Reda joined the Greens/EFA group. He was a member of the Legal Affairs committee as well as a substitute member of the Internal Market and Consumer Protection and Petitions committees. He was on the Steering Committee of the Digital Agenda intergroup, a forum of MEPs interested in digital issues.

On 27 March 2019, he announced in an online video that he had left the Pirate Party, protesting the fact that his former employee Gilles Bordelais, (whom he had previously championed as a suitable lead candidate for the party), had not voluntarily resigned as a candidate in the European elections while being under investigation for sexual harassment.

== Copyright reform ==
In 2014, Reda said that copyright reform would be his focus for the legislative term.

In November 2014, Reda was named rapporteur of the Parliament's review of 2001's Copyright Directive. His draft report recommended the EU-wide harmonisation of copyright exceptions, a reduction in term length, broad exceptions for educational purposes and a strengthening of authors' negotiating position in relation to publishers, among other measures.

Stakeholder reaction varied as the German artist coalition Initiative Urheberrecht generally welcomed the draft while the French collecting society SACD said it was "unacceptable"; author and copyright activist Cory Doctorow called the proposals "amazingly sensible", while former Swedish Pirate MEP Amelia Andersdotter criticised them as too conservative.

In 2015, Reda's report was passed by the legal affairs committee, but with an amendment that recommended restricting freedom of panorama in Europe. Reda strongly opposed this amendment and campaigned against it. The amendment was later voted down by the plenary of the European Parliament.

In 2019, Reda was described as a leader in the protests against Article 13 (colloquially called the "upload filter" provision) of the proposed EU Copyright Directive, in which 100,000 people participated in street demonstrations on March 23, 2019.

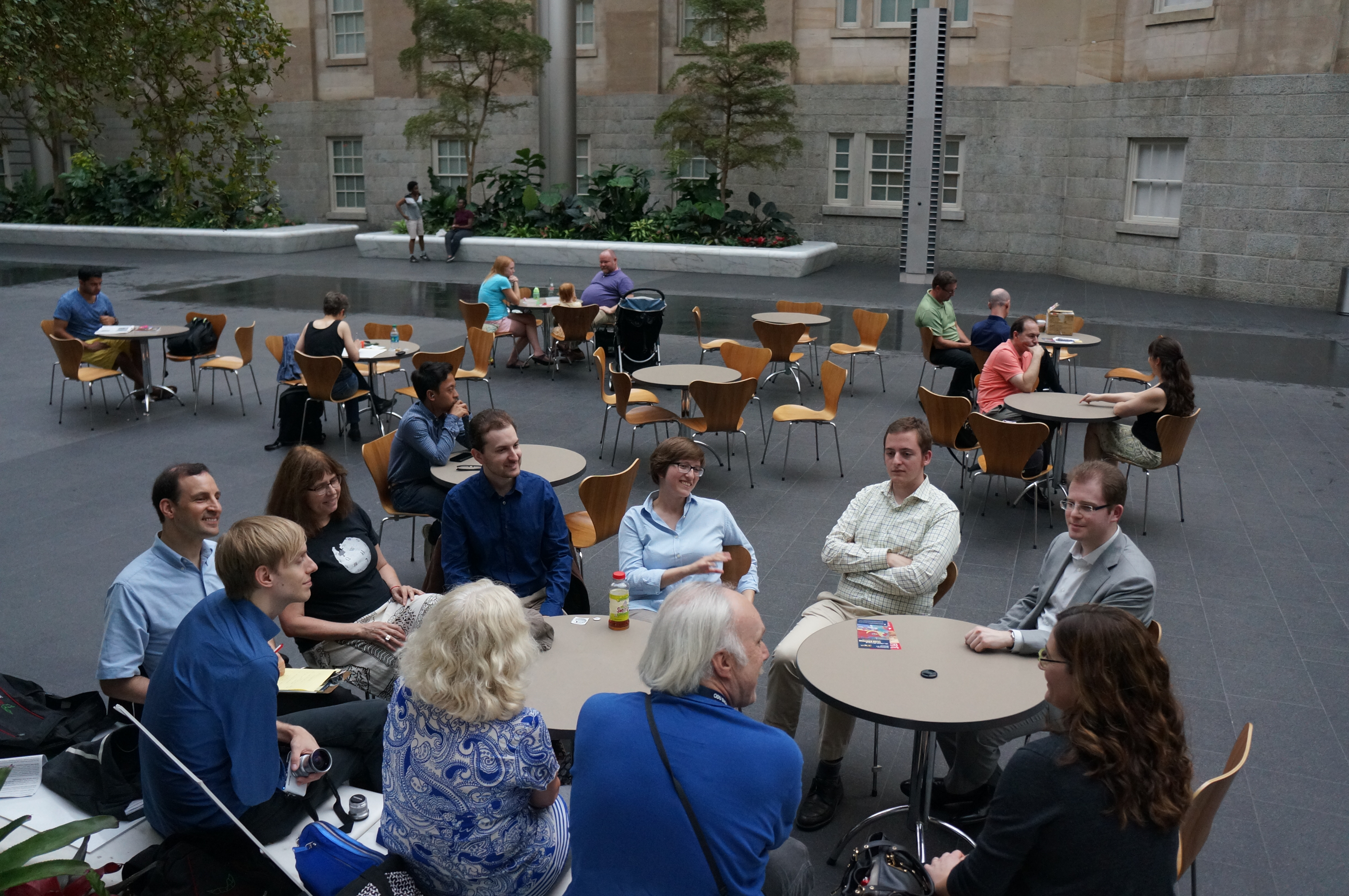
MEP Reda at informal meeting in Washington, DC, concerning copyright issues in the United States (2015)

== Personal life ==
On 26 January 2022, Reda announced that he is transgender and now uses the first name Felix.
