= Stefan Flod =

Swedish politician

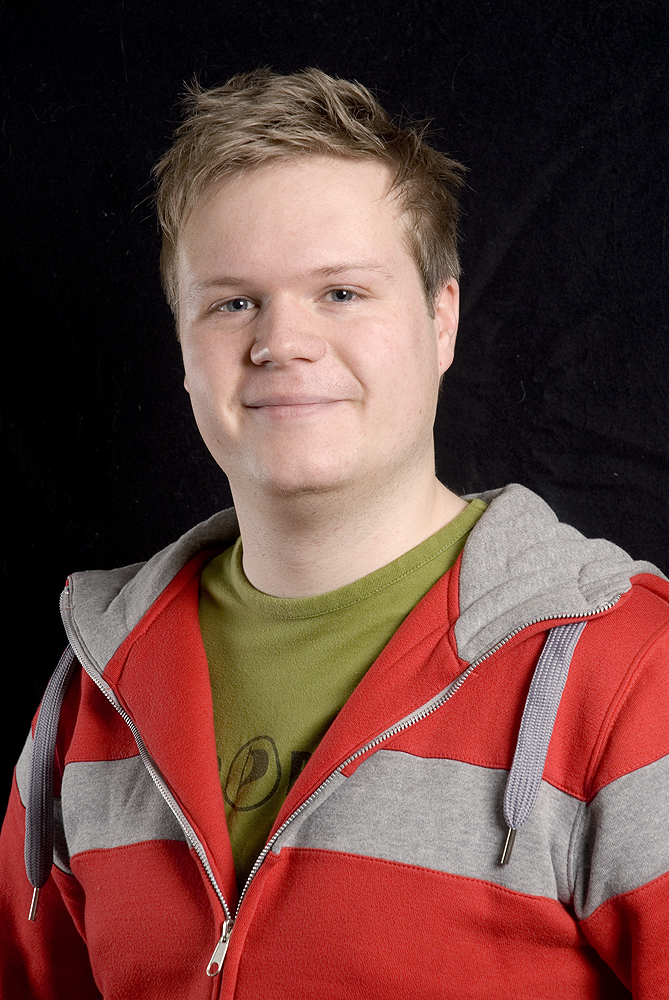

President of Young Pirate
- In office 2007–2011
- Preceded by: Hugi Ásgeirsson

Personal details
- Born: 30 April 1985 (age 40) Gävle, Sweden
- Party: Ung Pirat
- Other political affiliations: Piratpartiet
- Website: Blog

Stefan Flod (born 30 April 1985) is the former President of the Swedish Youth Organization Young Pirate (Ung Pirat). He was also member of the board in the Swedish Pirate Party (Piratpartiet).
