= Amelia Andersdotter =

Swedish politician and Pirate Party MEP (born 1987)

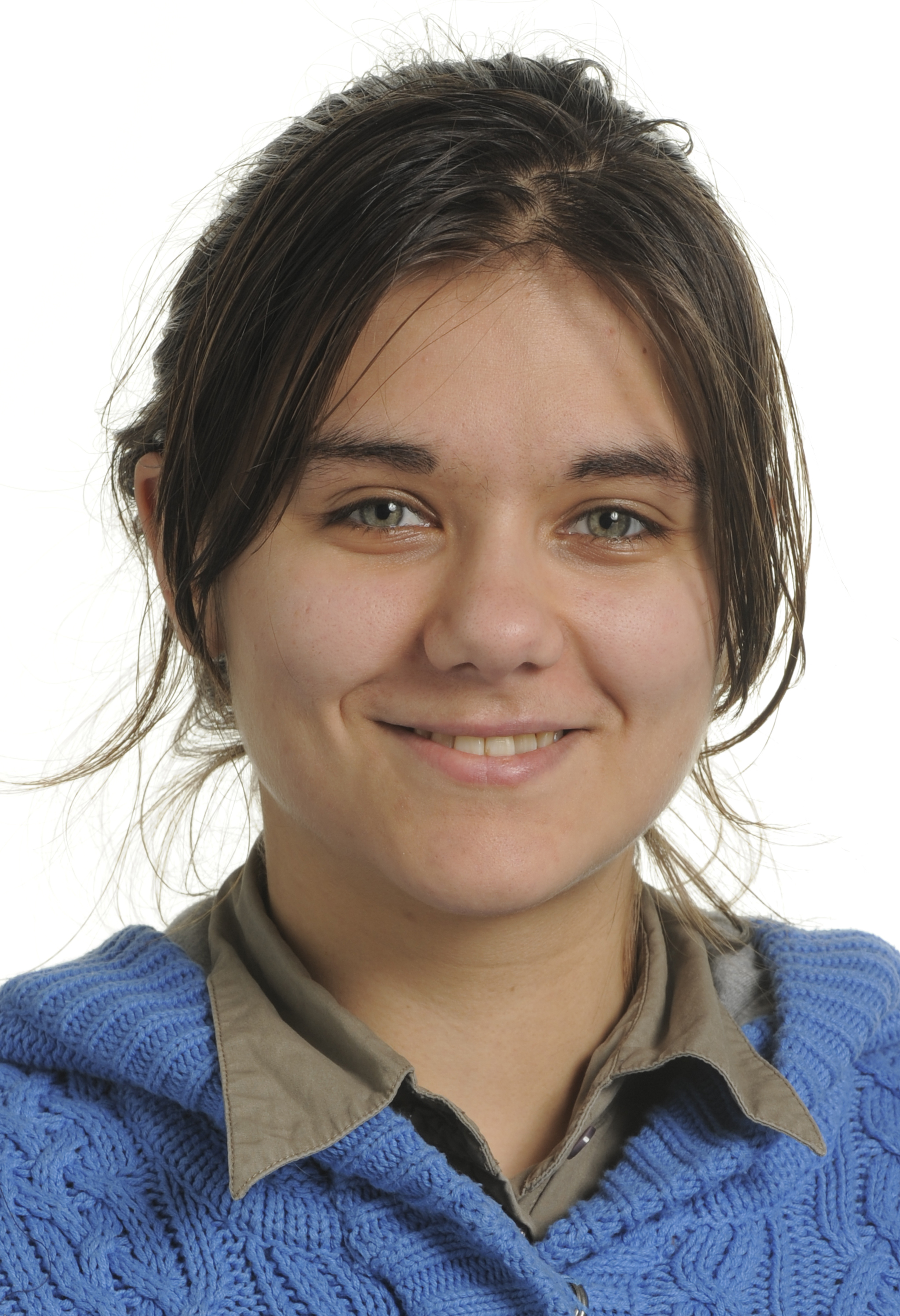
- Official portrait, 2012

Member of the European Parliament for Sweden
- In office 1 December 2011 – 25 May 2014

Personal details
- Born: 30 August 1987 (age 39) Uppsala, Sweden
- Party: Pirate Party (Greens–EFA)
- Education: Lund University (BSc, BLA), Uppsala University (MSc)
- Website: Amelia Andersdotter

Amelia Anna Matilda Katarina Andersdotter (born 30 August 1987) is a Swedish politician and former Member of the European Parliament (2011–2014), elected on the Pirate Party list in the 2009 election.

== Political career ==
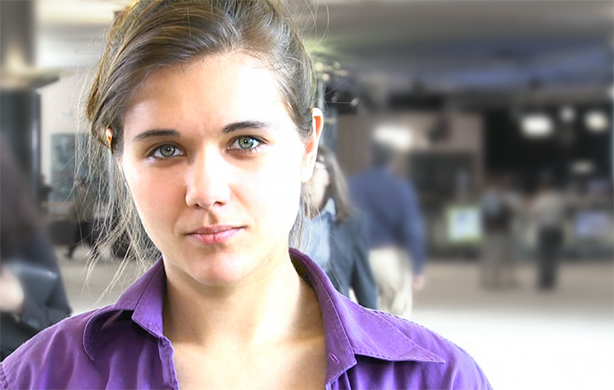
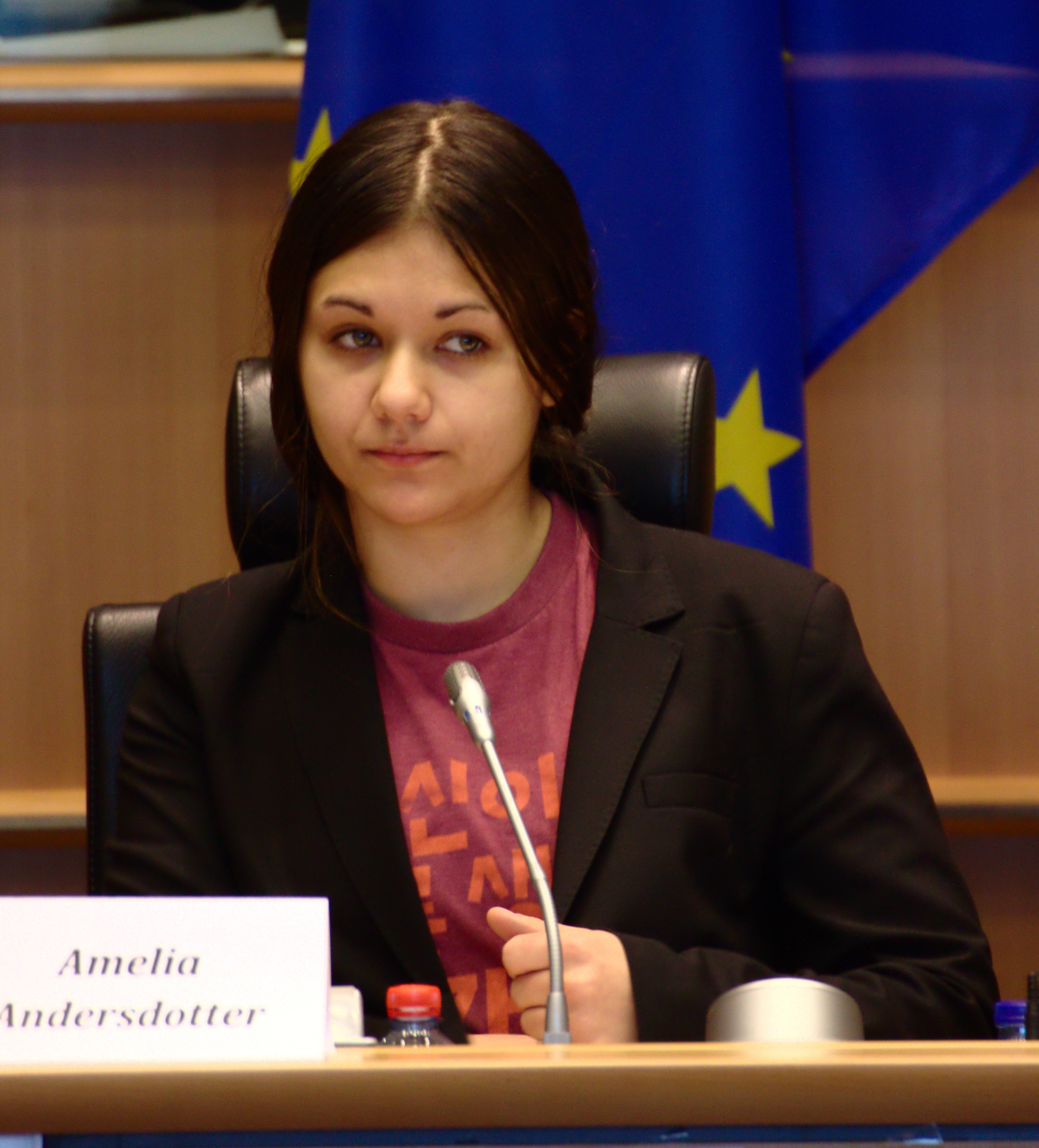
Amelia Andersdotter in 2014

Amelia joined the Piratpartiet shortly after its formation in 2006. From June 2007 to March 2010 she was the international coordinator of Ung Pirat, the party's youth wing. In this capacity she coordinated contacts with other groups in Sweden, other pirate political movements around the world, and the organization's international policy viewpoints.

In 2009, she was named the second candidate on Piratpartiet's list for the European Parliament elections in June of that year. While Piratpartiet did not gain enough votes for a second MEP under the treaty of Nice, they did get enough votes to award her a seat under the terms of the new treaty of Lisbon that was to come into effect December that year. Difficulties with the ratification process of the treaty of Lisbon meant that the seat would not be granted until December 2011. From 2011 to 2014, she was the youngest member of the European Parliament.

In the interim period between her election and her inauguration, she spent much time travelling to different parts of the world talking about her experiences as a young politician and as an advocate of new ideas in information policy. Amongst others the Ars Electronica festival in Linz, Austria and a visit to South Korea in 2010, which later inspired her political involvement on the Korean peninsula delegation in the European Parliament. She also travelled extensively inside Europe during this time, involving herself in the work of Pirate Parties around Europe.

During her term in office, she focused her efforts around information policy. She was a part of the Committee on Industry, Research and Energy. She was also a substitute member of the Committee on International Trade and the Committee on Budgetary Control. She also served as a full member of the parliamentary delegation to the Korean Peninsula, and a substitute member of the delegation for the Andean community.

A longtime critic of the Anti-Counterfeiting Trade Agreement, her advice to reject it was carried by the ITRE committee, the first of parliamentary committees to propose a rejection of the agreement. Other committees soon followed in the rejection. The agreement was soundly rejected by the European Parliament.

Other areas she worked on include a proposal for a recast of the Union's Re-use of Public Sector Information Directive where she publicly criticized the Swedish government for resisting the proposed changes in access and cost regimes. She is also a supporter of public investments in fibre-to-the-home infrastructures.

=== Awards ===
- Top Ten Internet Activists of 2012, The Daily Dot

== Post-parliamentary work ==
After working in the European Parliament, Amelia was a guest researcher at Centre for Internet and Society (India) and technical standards researcher at Article19 and ANEC (organisation). She made large contributions to the IEEE 802E Privacy Recommendations standard as well as the ISO PC 3117 committee work on privacy and security for home internet-of-things appliances. In later years, she has continued technical standards work to promote power saving features and sustainable hardware on behalf of the operator and device manufacturer communities.

== Personal life ==
Amelia Andersdotter was born on 30 August 1987 in Uppsala, Sweden, the first of three children. Her mother, Lotta Lille, is a journalist, and her father, Anders Lundquist, is a teacher and chess tutor. Her sisters are Ulrika and Karolina. She also has a half-brother on her father's side, Eirik Lundquist. After graduating at Rosendalsgymnasiet in Uppsala, she attended university in Lund, where she studied mathematics, physics, Spanish and business law. However, Amelia was elected before completing her studies.

She has lived in many parts of Europe and India, including Lund, Uppsala, Bucharest, Ghent, Bangalore and Brussels.

== See also ==
- Pirate Party
- File sharing
- Christian Engström
- Anna Troberg
