= Bambuser =

Swedish streaming media company

- Company type: Public
- Headquarters: Stockholm, {{{location_country}}}
- Area served: Worldwide
- Industry: Video Commerce SaaS provider
- Launched: 2007

Bambuser AB (publ) is a Swedish company founded in 2007. Bambuser provides a video commerce platform for brands looking to provide engaging and personalized shopping experiences. Bambuser is a global brand headquartered in Stockholm, Sweden. In May 2017, Bambuser was listed on Nasdaq First North stock exchange.

== History ==
Bambuser started out as an online community that was an interactive mobile video streaming platform which enabled users to effortlessly stream and share live video using a smartphone or a computer equipped with a webcam. In addition to being accessible on the Bambuser website, broadcasts were also able to be shared on various social media websites such as Facebook, Twitter, Tumblr and Blogger. The Bambuser community was a free-to-use service for private individuals and representatives of charities.

=== Bambuser Community in the Media ===
In 2010, Finnish broadcasting channel YLE adopted Bambuser as an alternative platform for their online and news broadcasts. This allowed YLE to get more live-coverage on their webpage, and allowed the viewers to interact with the reporters on the scene.

In November 2010, Bambuser was one of the finalists in The Europas, the European Startup Awards. 33,126 votes were cast across 23 categories, and eight judges deliberated over the results.

On January 1, 2011, the Swedish Pirate party celebrated its five-year anniversary with a Bambuser live broadcast with party leader Rick Falkvinge and vice party leader Anna Troberg. Live in the video, Falkvinge sent a tweet saying he stepped down as party leader, and he announced that his successor would be Troberg.

=== Bambuser Community use in the Middle East ===
During the demonstrations in Egypt, Bambuser (along with microblogging site Twitter) was blocked by the government. Shortly thereafter most of the country's internet traffic was restricted. During this blackout, Bambuser set up a special Egypt page on their website, collecting all the streams originating from Egypt and the protests on Tahrir Square. This page later evolved into the North Africa/Middle East page.

During the protests in Bahrain, a similar situation emerged, as government officials blocked access to the Bambuser homepage. In the Syrian civil war, Bambuser was used to a great extent by citizen journalists in an effort to document and raise awareness of the events taking place inside the country. On 17 February 2012, Syria was reported to have blocked access to the Bambuser website.

During the Gezi protests in Turkey, citizens started broadcasting the police violence and oppression of the AKP regime with the Bambuser app. As a response, the Prime Ministry banned Bambuser in Turkey illegally, without a court decision. The ban was still ongoing as 4 April 2014.

=== Associated Press ===
The Associated Press are stakeholders in Bambuser, and are active users. Thousands of AP reporters worldwide are equipped with the Bambuser app for capturing and broadcasting live video and photo content. AP entered into a partnership deal connected to the Bambuser Community in April 2012. Since then, users of the Bambuser service have had the option to share their broadcasts with the AP. The partnership enables AP to use Bambuser as a source for user-generated content coming from citizen journalists. In addition to sharing the actual content, users were required to disclose some form of contact information which enables AP to verify the authenticity of the broadcast material and properly credit the author.

On June 20, 2013 the partnership between the two companies was extended when the AP announced their purchase of a minority stake in Bambuser.
