= Ipsos Affluent Survey =

US research study of high-income people

The Ipsos Affluent Survey, formerly known as Mendelsohn Affluent Survey was founded in 1977 as a research study of high-income individuals in the United States, collecting quantitative data on their lives, lifestyles, media habits and purchase patterns. The study was founded and conducted by Monroe Mendelsohn Research (often called MMR) until that company's purchase by Ipsos in 2008, a global market research firm, which re-branded the study as the Ipsos Affluent Survey USA. As of 2016, the Ipsos Affluent Survey USA was being used by more than 250 organizations to support business decisions such as advertising sales, media planning, consumer insights, market sizing, and target profiling.

The study has traditionally defined “Affluent” as roughly the top 20% of adult population in terms of household income, and has raised its income threshold over the years accordingly. In 2008, the study began using $100,000 as the operational definition of “Affluent,” and plans to raise the threshold to $125,000 in the fall of 2017. The study is fielded continuously throughout the year, and data from it are released twice a year (Spring and Fall).

In 2011, Ipsos acquired Synovate, and in the process acquired similar studies EMS (covering Europe, the Middle East, Africa and Latin America) and PAX (covering the Asia-Pacific region). These have since been re-branded as part of the Ipsos Affluent Survey, which now covers 51 countries.
