= Monroe Mendelsohn Research =

Monroe Mendelsohn Research, Inc.
- Industry: Marketing; Media research
- Founded: 1958; 68 years ago
- Founder: Monroe Mendelsohn
- Defunct: May 2008
- Fate: Acquired by Ipsos Group; Merged into MediaCT
- Headquarters: New York City, United States
- Subsidiaries: Mendelsohn Media Research, Inc.

Monroe Mendelsohn Research (MMR), Inc. (and its subsidiary Mendelsohn Media Research, Inc.) was an internationally recognized, full-service marketing and media research company headquartered in New York City. In May 2008, the company was acquired by the Ipsos Group and eventually merged into their MediaCT practice. Founded by Monroe Mendelsohn in 1958 to provide marketing consultation and conduct custom marketing research surveys, the company expanded beyond the custom research services it had initially been providing and now syndicates one of America’s well-known, respected and innovative media surveys, now known as The Ipsos Mendelsohn Affluent Survey. This syndicated survey is used by hundreds of advertisers, advertising agencies, and the media (magazines, newspapers, cable television networks, etc.) in their communications planning and buying activities.

To maintain as well as to enhance its marketing and media research expertise, Monroe Mendelsohn Research monitored industry developments by being an active member of the Advertising Research Foundation, The Council of American Survey Research Organizations, The Luxury Marketing Council, the City and Regional Magazine Association, The Pharmaceutical Marketing Research Group, The Magazine Publishers of America, The Western Publications Association, and The International Regional Magazine Association. The company is now part of Ipsos MediaCT in North America.
