= Katarina Stensson =

Swedish politician (born 1988)

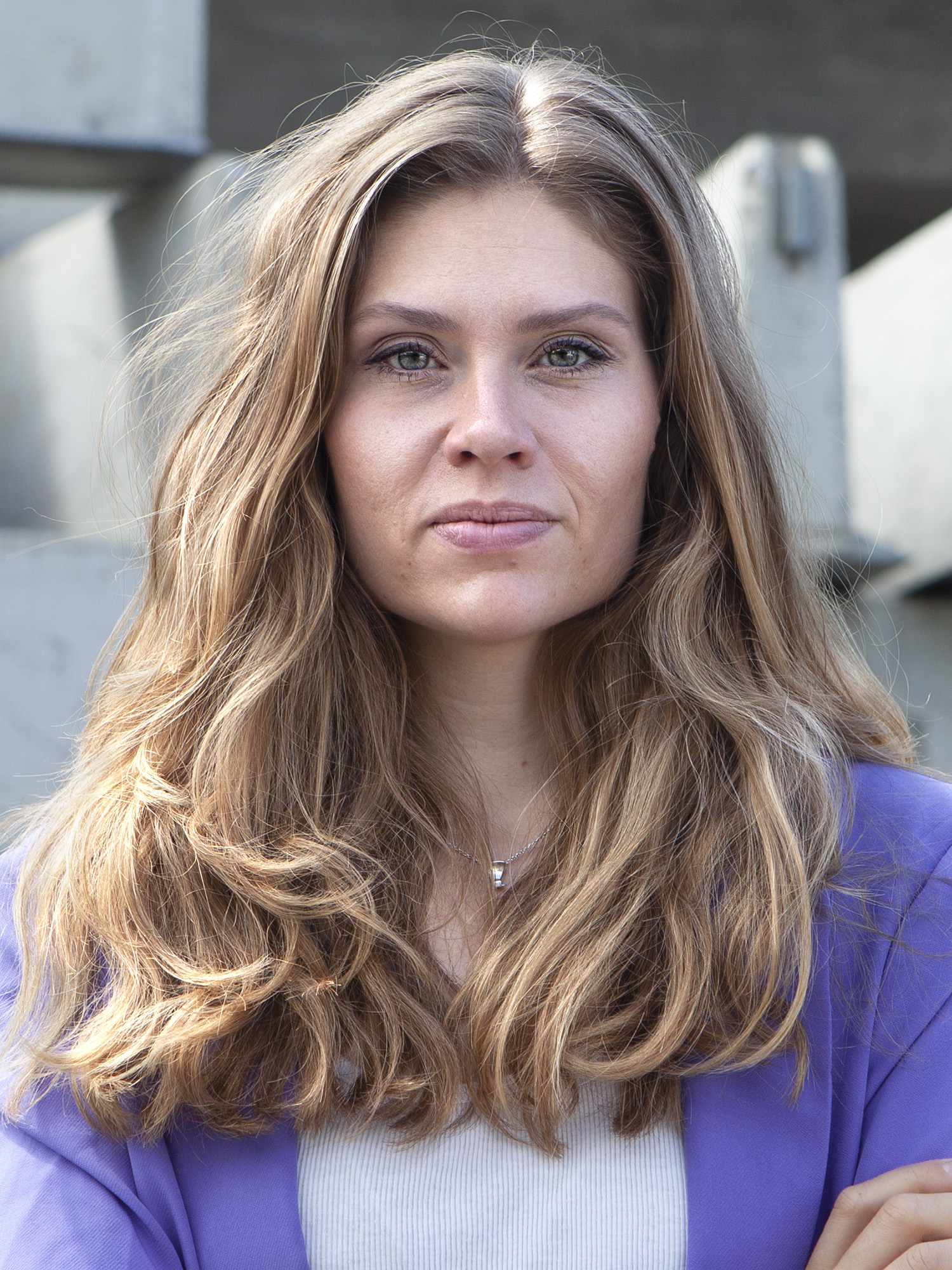
- Esther Stensson in 2022

Leader of the Pirate Party
- Incumbent
- Assumed office 13 October 2019
- Preceded by: Magnus Andersson

Personal details
- Born: Esther Katarina Stensson; 21 August 1988 (age 38) Örebro, Sweden
- Party: Pirate Party
- Education: KTH Royal Institute of Technology
- Occupation: Politician, teacher
- Website: katarinastensson.com

Esther Katarina Stensson (born 21 August 1988 in Örebro) is a Swedish politician and leader of the Swedish Pirate Party with a term from 2019 to 2021 Stensson took a masters exam in engineering physics at KTH Royal Institute of Technology in 2014 and a degree in licentiate in physics in 2018. Stensson is the vice-president of the company "Checheza AB", a company focused on online classes. In 2020 she took the teacher's exam to work as a teacher in physics and mathematics.

== Biography ==
Between 2012 and 2014, Stensson was the project leader for organization Womengineer. In the year 2014 Stensson founded IGEday, a national event aimed at encourage girls to become engineers. Stensson had a seat in the board of directors for the free math-tutering service Mattecentrum from 2014 to 2017.
