= 2009 European Parliament election in Sweden =

- 7 June 2009

18 seats to the European Parliament (20 seats from December 2011)
- Turnout: 45.53% (▲7.68 pp)
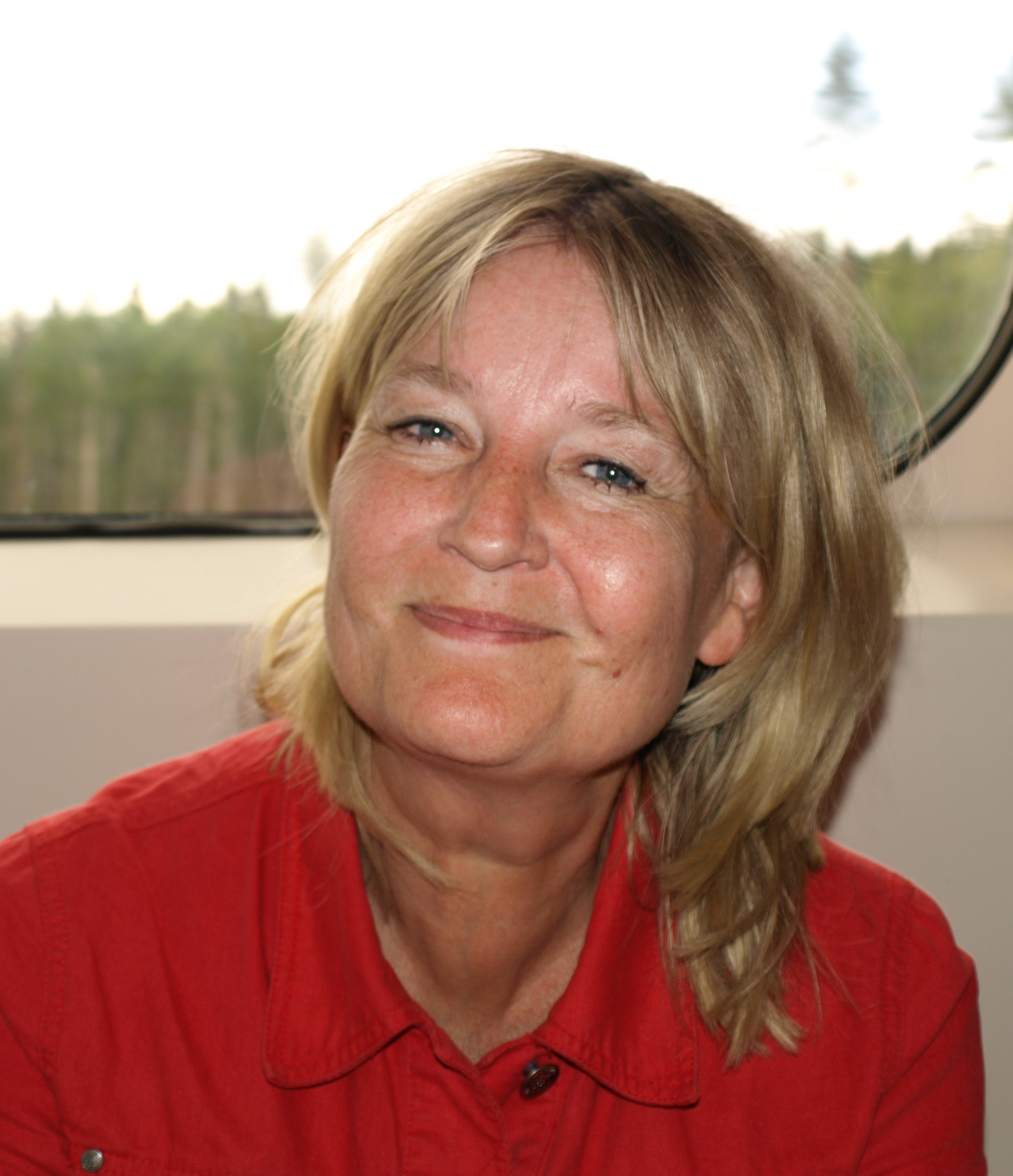

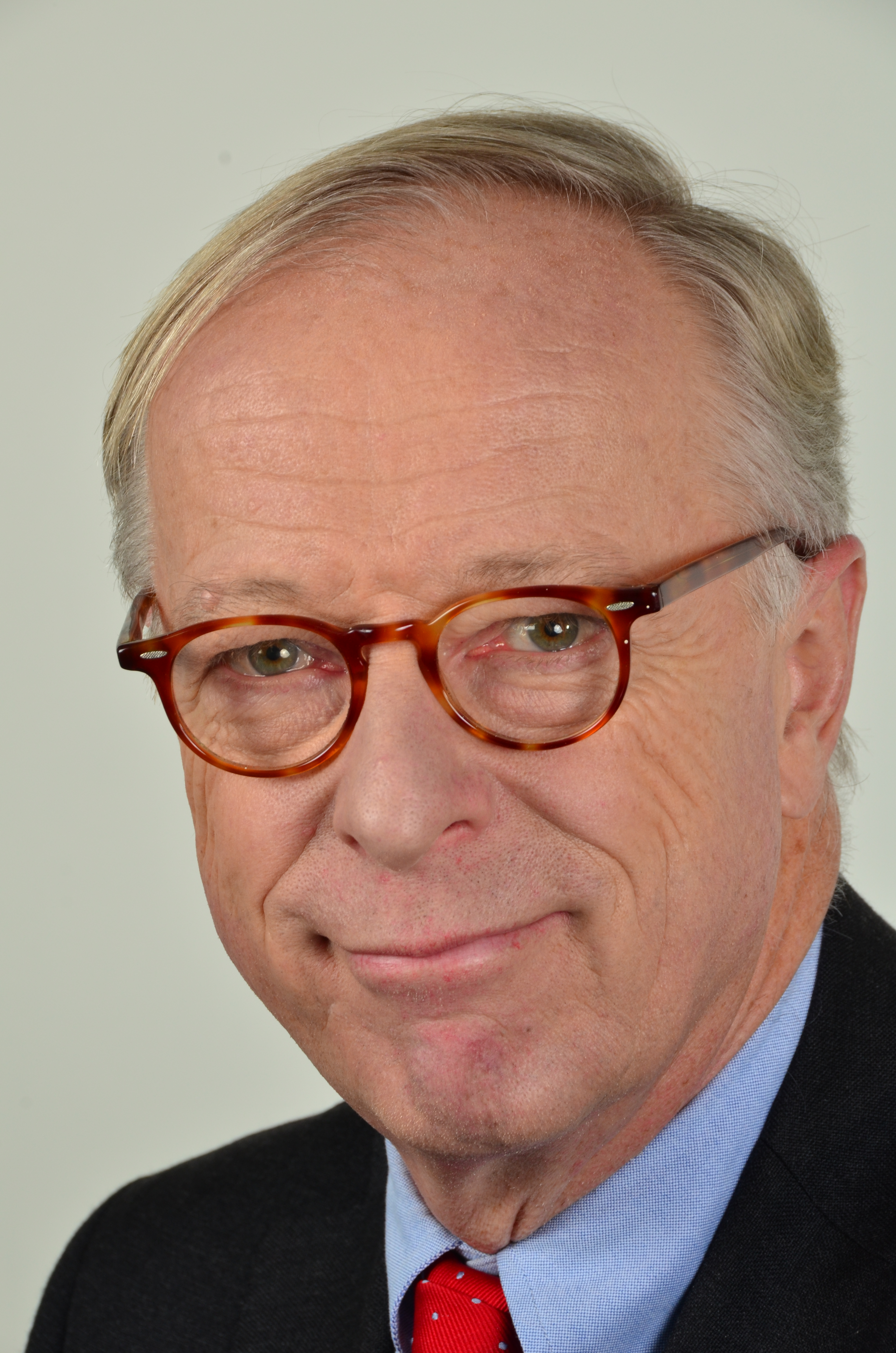

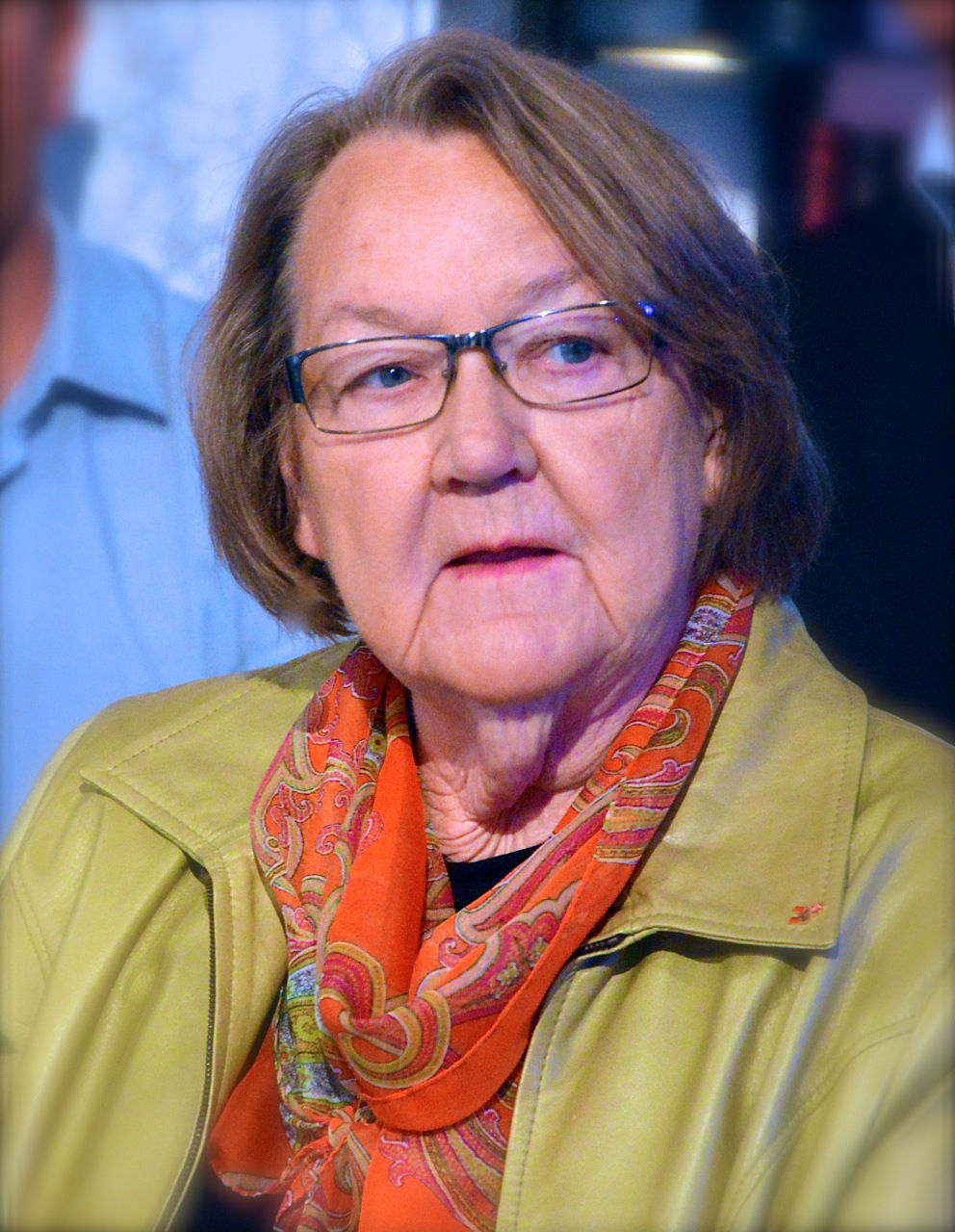

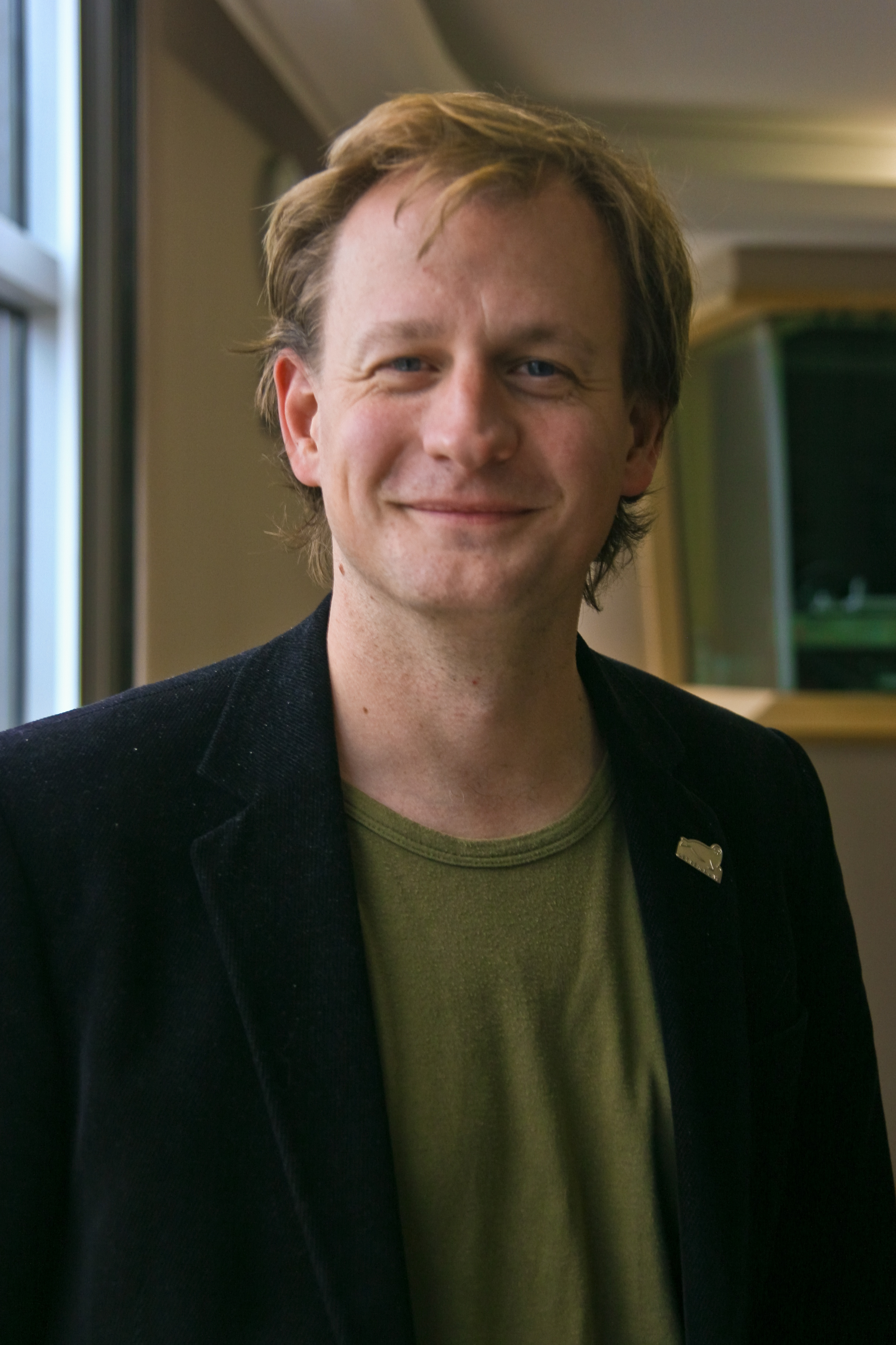

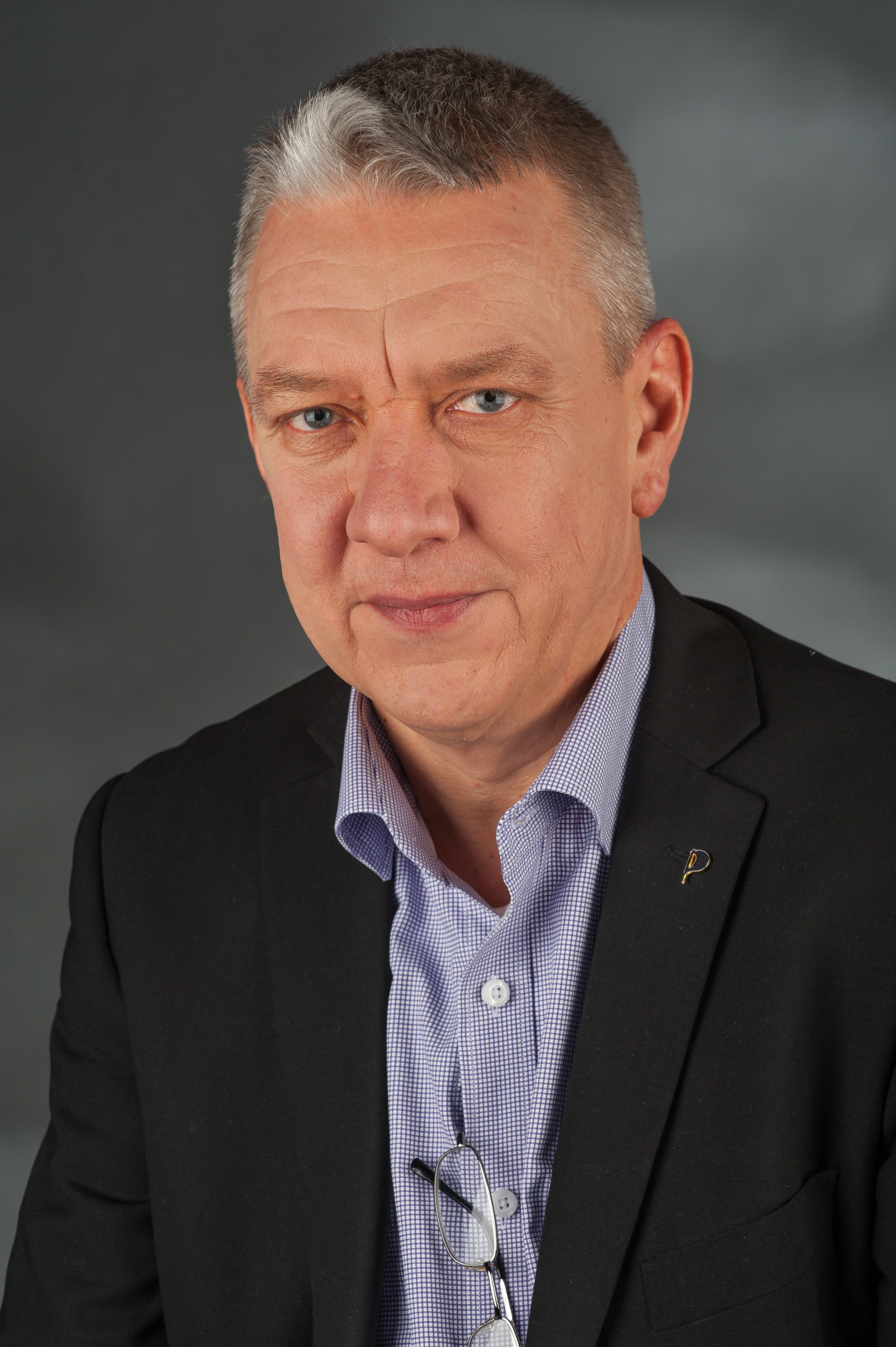

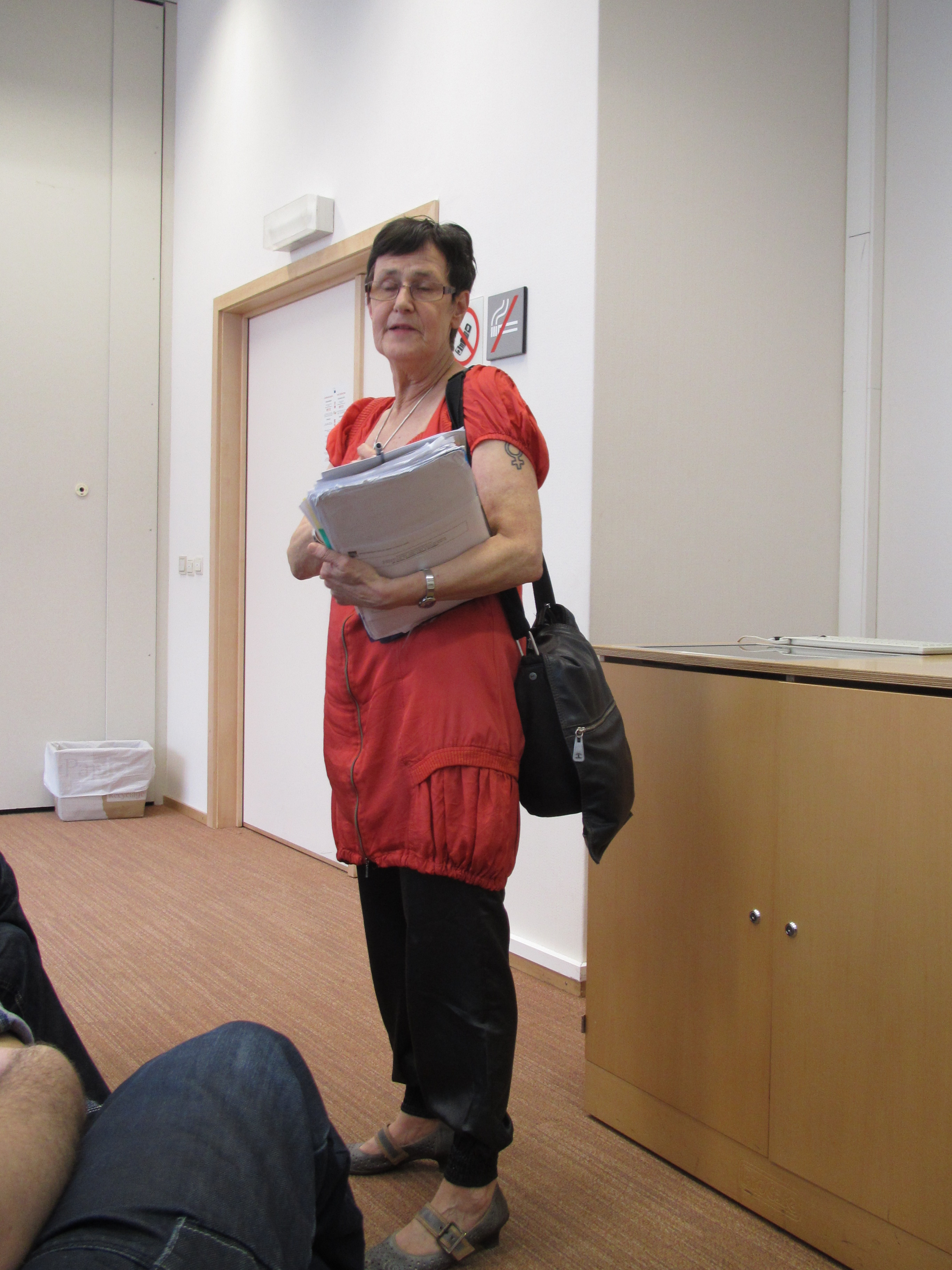

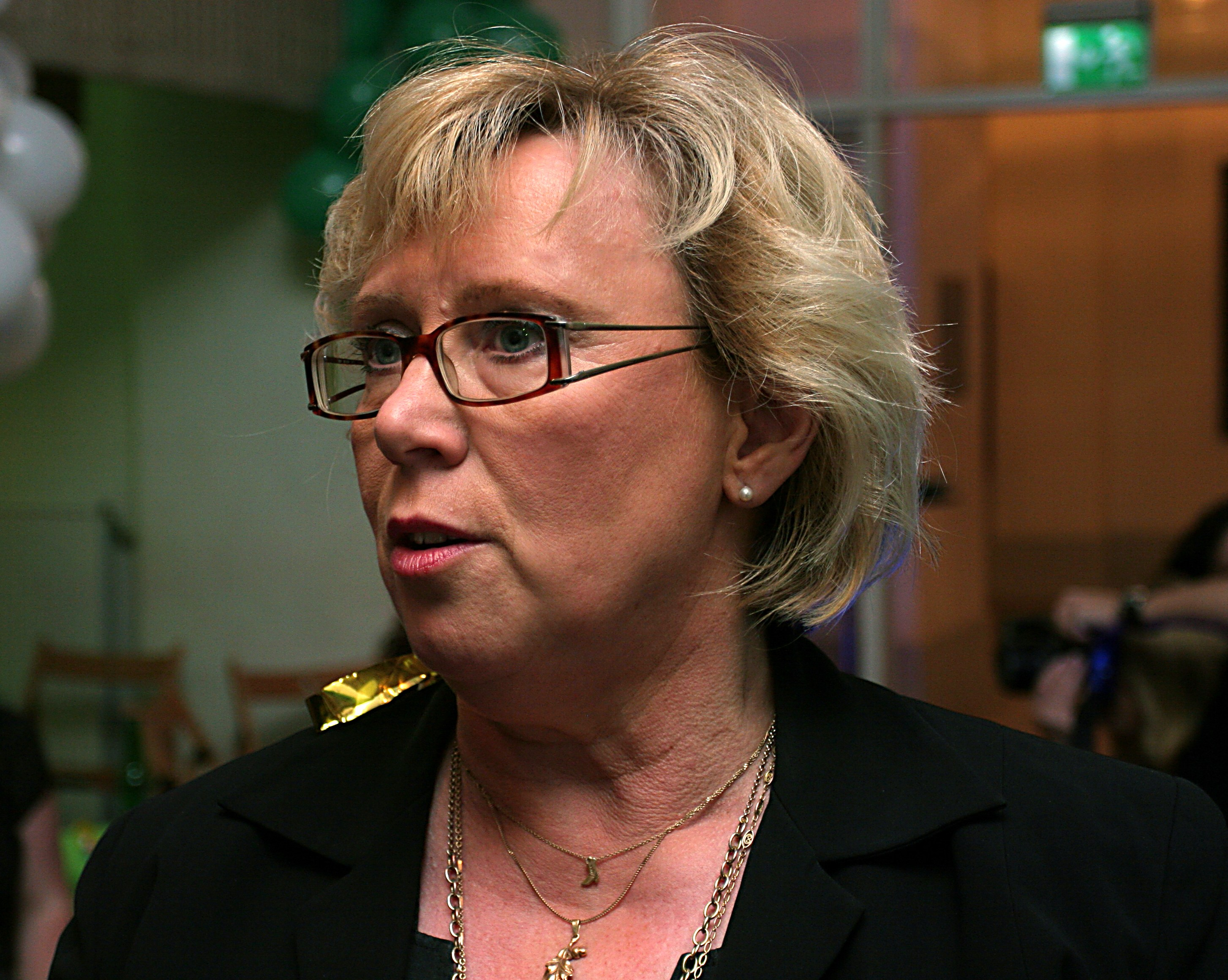

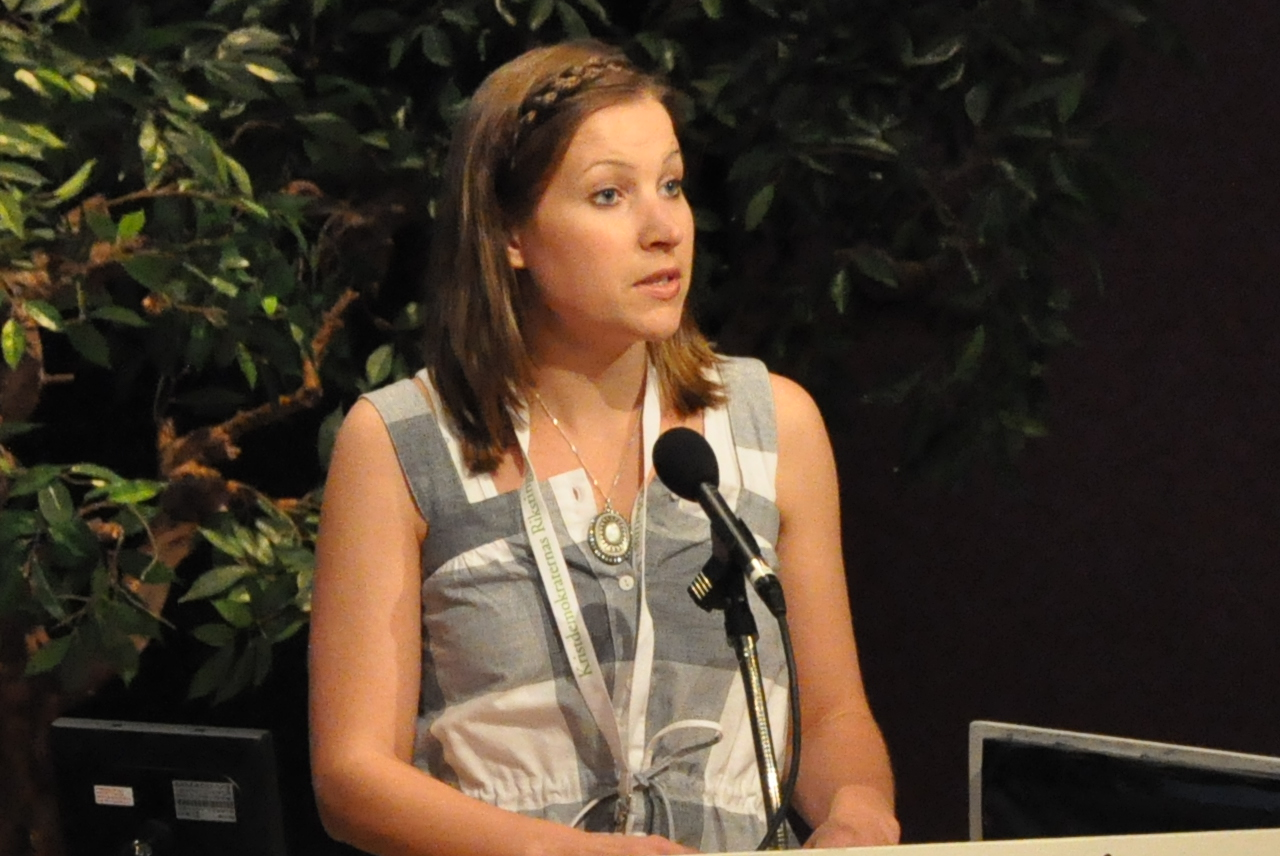
| | First party | Second party | Third party |
|---|---|---|---|
| Leader | Marita Ulvskog | Gunnar Hökmark | Marit Paulsen |
| Party | Social Democrats | Moderate | Liberals |
| Alliance | S&D | EPP | ALDE |
| Last election | 5 seats, 24.56% | 4 seats, 18.25% | 2 seats, 9.86% |
| Seats won | 5 (6) | 4 | 3 |
| Seat change | 0 (▲1) | 0 | ▲1 |
| Popular vote | 773,513 | 596,710 | 430,385 |
| Percentage | 24.41% | 18.83% | 13.58% |
| Swing | ▼0.15% | ▲0.58% | ▲3.72% |
| | Fourth party | Fifth party | Sixth party |
| Leader | Carl Schlyter | Christian Engström | Eva-Britt Svensson |
| Party | Green | Pirate | Left |
| Alliance | European Greens | None | GUE/NGL |
| Last election | 1 seat, 5.96% | new | 2 seats, 12.79% |
| Seats won | 2 | 1 (2) | 1 |
| Seat change | ▲1 | ▲1 (▲2) | ▼1 |
| Popular vote | 349,114 | 225,915 | 179,182 |
| Percentage | 11.02% | 7.13% | 5.66% |
| Swing | ▲5.06% | new | ▼7.13% |
| | Seventh party | Eighth party |
| Leader | Lena Ek | Ella Bohlin |
| Party | Centre | Christian Democrats |
| Alliance | ALDE | EPP |
| Last election | 1 seat, 6.26% | 1 seat, 5.68% |
| Seats won | 1 | 1 |
| Seat change | 0 | 0 |
| Popular vote | 173,414 | 148,141 |
| Percentage | 5.47% | 4.68% |
| Swing | ▼0.79% | ▼1.00% |

The 2009 European Parliament election in Sweden was held on 7 June 2009 and determined the makeup of the Swedish delegation to the European Parliament. The election was held using a modified form of the Sainte-Laguë method of party-list proportional representation using the entire country as a single electoral constituency. There is a threshold limit of 4 percent for Swedish elections to the European Parliament, so that any party not receiving at least four percent of the votes will not be allocated any seats.

Sweden was allocated 18 seats in the European parliament for this term, a reduction from the 19 they were allocated in the 2004 election. From December 2011 Sweden has 20 seats.

The new Pirate Party polled at 7.1%, giving it one seat, and from December 2011 two seats after the Treaty of Lisbon. The eurosceptic June List saw the biggest slump in support, falling nearly 11% and losing all 3 seats.

Turnout increased compared to the last election, from 37.9% to 45.5%.

== Opinion polls ==
| Party | Last election | 29 April 2009 DN / Synovate | 8 May 2009 Expressen / Demoskop | 8 May 2009 SvD / Sifo | 15 May 2009 TV4 Group / Novus | 15 May 2009 SvD / Sifo | 20 May 2009 DN / Synovate | 21 May 2009 Expressen / Demoskop | 21 May 2009 TV4 Group / Novus | 21 May 2009 Skop | 22 May 2009 SvD / Sifo | 29 May 2009 Expressen / Demoskop | 27 May 2009 TV4 Group / Novus | 30 May 2009 SvD / Sifo | 3 June 2009 TV4 Group / Novus | 5 June 2009 Sifo | 5 June 2009 Synovate | 5 June 2009 Expressen / Demoskop | 6 June 2009 TV 4 / Novus |
| Social Democrats (s) | 24.6% | 29.2% | 32% | 35.25% | 29.4% | 32.6% | 30.3% | 35.9% | 29.1% | 30.5% | 31.9% | 30.8% | 29.1% | 31.7% | 30.4% | 27.9% | 26.2% | 27.9% | 26.5% |
| Moderate Party (m) | 18.3% | 29.7% | 31% | 27.59% | 25.9% | 25.6% | 26.3% | 24.1% | 25.3% | 27.9% | 23.9% | 26.0% | 22.3% | 22.6% | 20.2% | 21.3% | 22.0% | 25.8% | 19.0% |
| Centre Party (c) | 6.3% | 5.4% | 5% | 4.71% | 5.9% | 5.6% | 5.7% | 7.4% | 4.8% | 5.8% | 5.5% | 5.7% | 5.0% | 5.2% | 5.5% | 5.1% | 6.2% | 5.4% | 5.9% |
| Liberal People's Party (fp) | 9.8% | 9.0% | 6% | 6.80% | 10.2% | 7.7% | 9.0% | 5.5% | 8.8% | 8.1% | 9.3% | 8.1% | 9.4% | 10.1% | 9.7% | 11.4% | 10.9% | 10.7% | 11.1% |
| Christian Democrats (kd) | 5.7% | 5.2% | 4% | 3.95% | 4.6% | 4.5% | 4.7% | 3.4% | 5.2% | 5.1% | 3.6% | 4.3% | 5.4% | 3.1% | 4.5% | 4.4% | 6.2% | 5.2% | 4.9% |
| Left Party (v) | 12.8% | 5.8% | 6% | 5.28% | 5.8% | 4.3% | 6.0% | 5.6% | 7.1% | 6.0% | 5.1% | 5.6% | 7.6% | 6.5% | 6.8% | 6.0% | 5.0% | 5.4% | 6.7% |
| Green Party (mp) | 5.9% | 7.0% | 6% | 7.90% | 6.7% | 8.3% | 9.1% | 7.6% | 8.7% | 7.9% | 9.2% | 8.1% | 10.8% | 10.2% | 10.5% | 10.9% | 11.0% | 6.8% | 10.2% |
| June List (jl) | 14.4% | 1.3% | 1% | 1.68% | 2.3% | 2.1% | 2.2% | 1.2% | 2.0% | 1.5% | 2.2% | 1.1% | 1.5% | 1.9% | 2.2% | 1.7% | 2.9% | 1.5% | 3.8% |
| Pirate Party (pp) | | 5.1% | 5% | 3.38% | 5.6% | 5.5% | 5.4% | 7.9% | 6.0% | 4.0% | 6.1% | 8.2% | 6.2% | 6.0% | 6.7% | 8.2% | 6.1% | 8.8% | 8.5% |
| Feminist Initiative (fi) | | — | 1% | — | — | — | — | 0.3% * | — | — | — | 0.6% | — | — | — | — | — | 0.6% | — |
| Sweden Democrats (sd) | 1.13% | — | 2% | 2.51% | 3.1% | 2.4% | — | 1.1% | 2.1% | 2.2% | 2.1% | 1.6% | 1.6% | 2.3% | 2.3% | — | — | 1.8% | 2.0% |
| Government (m, c, fp, kd) | 40.0% | 49.3% | 46% | 43.05% | 46.6% | 43.5% | 43.4% | 40.4% | 44.1% | 46.9% | 42.3% | 44.1% | 42.1% | 41.0% | 33.9% | 42.2% | 45.3% | 47.1% | 40.9% |
| Opposition (s, v, mp) | 43.4% | 42.0% | 44% | 48.43% | 41.9% | 45.2% | 45.4% | 49.1% | 44.9% | 44.4% | 46.2% | 44.5% | 47.5% | 48.4% | 47.7% | 44.8% | 42.2% | 40.1% | 43.4% |
| Others (jl., pp, fi, sd) | 15.5% | 6.4% | 9% | 7.57% | 11.0% | 10.0% | 7.6% | 11.1% | 10.1% | 7.7% | 10.4% | 11.5% | 9.3% | 10.2% | 11.2% | 9.9% | 9.0% | 12.7% | 14.3% |

* Based on delta of +0.3% in 29 May poll.

== Results ==
The final results were published by the Swedish Election Authority on 11 June 2009. From December 2011, the Pirate Party and Swedish Social Democratic Party had one more seat each after the Treaty of Lisbon.

| Party | Votes | % | Seats | | | |
| Party | Votes | % | Won | +/– | Post-Lisbon | +/– |
|---|---|---|---|---|---|---|
| Swedish Social Democratic Party | 773,513 | 24.41 | 5 | 0 | 6 | +1 |
| Moderate Party | 596,710 | 18.83 | 4 | 0 | 4 | 0 |
| Liberals | 430,385 | 13.58 | 3 | +1 | 3 | 0 |
| Green Party | 349,114 | 11.02 | 2 | +1 | 2 | 0 |
| Pirate Party | 225,915 | 7.13 | 1 | +1 | 2 | +1 |
| Left Party | 179,182 | 5.66 | 1 | –1 | 1 | 0 |
| Centre Party | 173,414 | 5.47 | 1 | 0 | 1 | 0 |
| Christian Democrats | 148,141 | 4.68 | 1 | 0 | 1 | 0 |
| June List | 112,355 | 3.55 | 0 | –3 | 0 | 0 |
| Sweden Democrats | 103,584 | 3.27 | 0 | 0 | 0 | 0 |
| Feminist Initiative | 70,434 | 2.22 | 0 | New | 0 | 0 |
| Labour Initiative (SP–RS) | 2,862 | 0.09 | 0 | 0 | 0 | 0 |
| National Democrats | 1,329 | 0.04 | 0 | 0 | 0 | 0 |
| European Workers Party | 196 | 0.01 | 0 | 0 | 0 | 0 |
| Socialists | 78 | 0.00 | 0 | New | 0 | 0 |
| Swedish National Democratic Party | 57 | 0.00 | 0 | 0 | 0 | 0 |
| Partiet.se | 32 | 0.00 | 0 | New | 0 | 0 |
| 666 for an EU Superstate | 28 | 0.00 | 0 | 0 | 0 | 0 |
| Freedom and Justice Party | 28 | 0.00 | 0 | 0 | 0 | 0 |
| Communist League | 18 | 0.00 | 0 | 0 | 0 | 0 |
| Democratic National Party | 15 | 0.00 | 0 | New | 0 | 0 |
| Blankledamöterna | 13 | 0.00 | 0 | New | 0 | 0 |
| Nordic Union | 11 | 0.00 | 0 | New | 0 | 0 |
| Republican Right | 2 | 0.00 | 0 | 0 | 0 | 0 |
| Parties not on the ballot | 1,130 | 0.04 | 0 | – | 0 | 0 |
| Total | 3,168,546 | 100.00 | 18 | –1 | 20 | +2 |
| Valid votes | 3,168,546 | 98.17 | | | | |
| Invalid/blank votes | 59,015 | 1.83 | | | | |
| Total votes | 3,227,561 | 100.00 | | | | |
| Registered voters/turnout | 7,088,303 | 45.53 | | | | |
Source: Val

=== Municipalities ===
The map shows which European party group received the most votes in each municipality

Municipalities in which European party groups received the most votes:

- Greens-EFA: Lund, Gothenburg, Sundbyberg
- ALDE: Sunne, Valdemarsvik, Ydre
- EPP-ED: Danderyd, Vellinge, Lidingö
- PES: Överkalix, Kalix, Hagfors

=== Votes summary ===
Popular vote
| Social Democrats | 24.41% |
| Moderate | 18.83% |
| Liberals | 13.58% |
| Green | 11.02% |
| Pirate | 7.13% |
| Left | 5.66% |
| Centre | 5.47% |
| Christian Democrats | 4.68% |
| June List | 3.55% |
| Sweden Democrats | 3.27% |
| Feminist Initiative | 2.22% |
| Other parties | 0.18% |

=== Seats summary ===
Parliamentary seats
| PES | 5(6) |
| EPP–ED | 5 |
| ALDE | 4 |
| Greens/EFA | 3(4) |
| GUE/NGL | 1 |

== See also ==
- Elections in Sweden
- List of political parties in Sweden
- 2009 European Parliament election
- Members of the European Parliament for Sweden 2009–2014
