= Christian Engström =

Swedish Pirate Party MEP (born 1960)

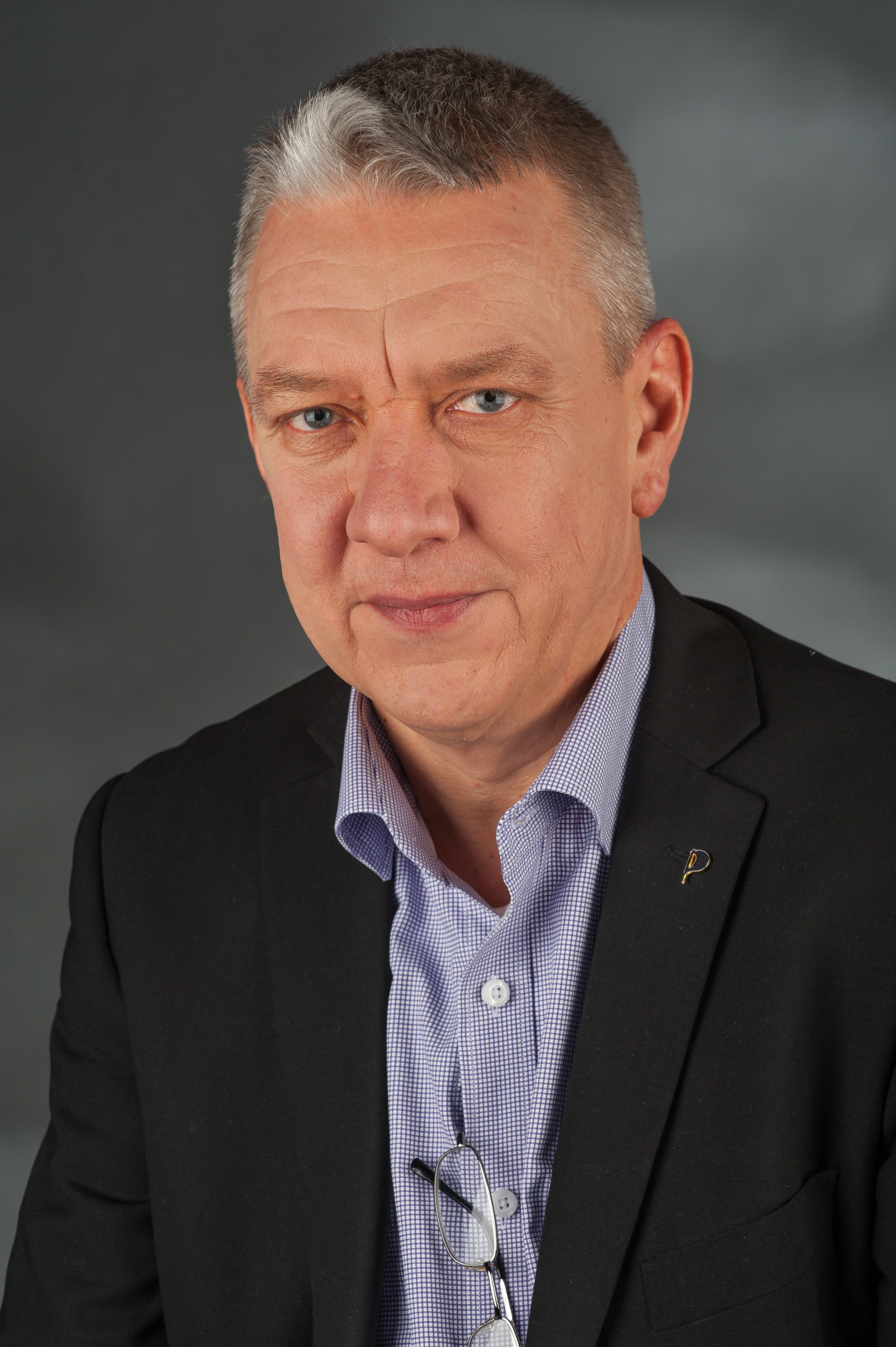
- Christian Engström, 2014

Member of the European Parliament for Sweden
- In office 14 July 2009 – 1 July 2014

Personal details
- Born: 9 February 1960 (age 66) Stockholm, Sweden
- Party: Pirate Party (Greens–EFA)
- Education: Stockholm University
- Profession: Programmer
- Website: Official webpage

Video Introduction 2014 (English) / (Swedish)

Lars Christian Engström (born 9 February 1960) is a Swedish computer programmer, activist and politician. He is deputy chairman of the Swedish Pirate Party. Engström was elected a Member of the European Parliament (MEP) in the 2009 election.

== Education and career ==
Christian Engström was born in Högalid, Stockholm. He graduated from Stockholm University in 1983 with a degree in mathematics and computer science. While studying, Engström worked as a tutor at the university, teaching object-oriented programming in Simula. From 1978 he also worked part-time as a programmer at Skriptor, a small company which specialized in phonetic similarity searches for trademark names. After finishing his studies he started working full-time at the company. He became a partner in the firm in 1987 and in 1991 he became vice president. In 1997 the company was sold to the leading European trademark search house CompuMark. Engström stayed on in a similar capacity as before until 2001, when he left the company to set up his own consultancy firm Glindra AB.

== Activism and politics ==
For five years Engström worked as an unpaid activist within the Foundation for a Free Information Infrastructure (FFII), lobbying against software patents. He was active in the campaign against the EU software patent directive, which was rejected by the European Parliament in July 2005. He also co-founded the Swedish section of FFII and served as its deputy chairman during the first year.

In the late 1980s, Engström became a member of the Swedish Liberal People's Party. He served as a lay assessor (Swedish: nämndeman) for the party in the Stockholm District Court between 1992 and 1998 and was active in local politics in Bromma, Stockholm. He left the Liberal People's Party on 1 January 2006, following the founding of the Pirate Party.

Engström was elected a Member of the European Parliament (MEP) in the election held on 7 June 2009, in which the Pirate Party won 7.1% of the votes and received one mandate. However, when the Lisbon treaty came into effect a second mandate Amelia Andersdotter entered parliament for Piratpartiet. Engström was placed as his party's top candidate and received 43,808 votes (19% of the Pirate Party's total votes). After negotiations with some of the political groups of the European Parliament, it was announced on 25 June 2009 that Engström will join the green group (Greens–EFA).

Engström was the only Swedish member of the European Parliament who voted against Mary Honeyball's report "Sexual exploitation and prostitution and its impact on gender equality", which recommends EU member states to adopt the "Swedish Model" that criminalises the purchase of sexual services.

== Personal life ==
Engström is married and has one son. He lives with his family in Nacka, Stockholm County.

== See also ==
- Pirate Party
- File sharing
