= Rick Falkvinge =

Former leader of the Swedish Pirate Party (born 1972)

Rickard Falkvinge
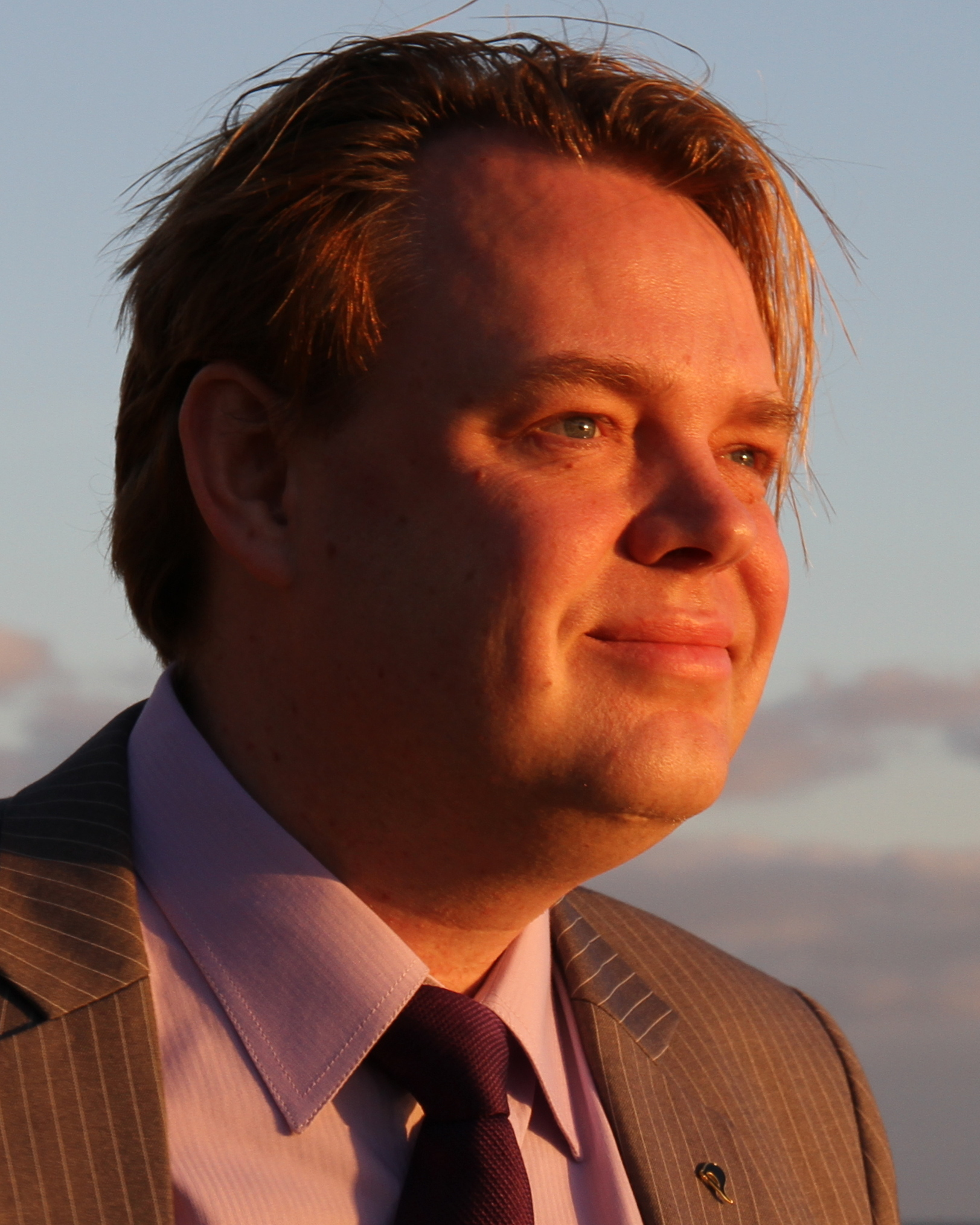
- Falkvinge in 2012

Founding Leader of the Pirate Party
- In office 1 January 2006 – 1 January 2011
- Monarch: Carl XVI Gustaf
- Prime Minister: Fredrik Reinfeldt
- Succeeded by: Anna Troberg

Personal details
- Born: Dick Greger Augustsson; 21 January 1972 (age 54) Gothenburg, Sweden
- Party: Pirate Party
- Occupation: Politician; entrepreneur
- Website: falkvinge.net

Rickard Falkvinge (born Dick Greger Augustsson, 21 January 1972) is a Swedish politician and the founder of the Pirate Party, which he led until 2011.

In 2005, he began developing a political party focused on illegal file sharing, copyright, and patent reform, which went on to elect members to the European Parliament in 2009 and helped inspire a global network of Pirate‑style parties, after which he became an advocate for digital rights and privacy.

== Early life and career ==
Falkvinge grew up in Ruddalen, Gothenburg, and studied natural sciences at Göteborgs Högre Samskola. During high school, he was active in political youth organisations, including the Moderat Skolungdom (Moderate School Youth), a part of the Moderata Ungdomsförbundet (Moderate Youth League), the youth organization of Sweden's Moderate Party.

He established his first company, Infoteknik, in 1988 at the age of 16. From 1994 to 1998, he worked as a software developer in Gothenburg, Kalmar, and Strömsund.

In 2004, he changed his name from Dick Augustsson to Rickard "Rick" Falkvinge. Falkvinge previously lived in Sollentuna, a suburb north of Stockholm, and later relocated to Berlin.

== The Pirate Party ==
In late 2005, Falkvinge began developing the idea of a political party focused on issues related to illegal file sharing, copyright infringement, and patent infringement. At the time, the main organization active in the copyright debate in Sweden was the nonpartisan Piratbyrån. On 16 December 2005, Falkvinge registered the domain name piratpartiet.se (The Pirate Party). The party’s website was launched on 1 January 2006 through a message on a Direct Connect hub, marking the start of a campaign to register a new political party in Sweden.

Falkvinge chaired the Pirate Party for 18 months, while the party relied on donations and supporter fundraising. He continued as leader through the 2009 European Parliament election, when the party won its first seats.

In the 2009 European Parliament election, The Pirate Party received 7.13% of the vote, making it the most popular party among voters under 30, with 25% support in that age group.

After the election, polls placed support at only 3.9%, below the 4.0% threshold for entry, and the party did not win representation in the 2010 parliamentary elections.

=== Controversies ===
During the launch of the party's 2010 election manifesto, Falkvinge stated that freedom of speech and freedom of the press should take precedence over the ban on possession of drawings that could be considered child sexual abuse materials (CSAM). The party proposed repealing the 1999 Child Pornography Act, which prohibits possession of audio and visual materials depicting child sexual abuse.

His comments were made in connection with a court case involving a manga researcher and translator charged with possessing drawings depicting minors in sexual contexts. The Swedish Union of Journalists expressed support for Falkvinge's position. The proposal generated internal disagreement within the Pirate Party, leading Falkvinge to initially retract his remarks before restating them in 2012.

Falkvinge has been a long-time supporter of The Pirate Bay, a Sweden-based online search index founded in 2003, known for facilitating peer-to-peer file sharing, including copyrighted material such as movies and video games.

On 31 May 2006, Swedish police raided the site's hosting facilities as part of an investigation into copyright violations, eventually leading to the Pirate Bay trial. In response, protests were organized across Europe on 3 June, during which Falkvinge delivered a speech titled "Nothing New Under the Sun". Falkvinge stated he was "invited daily to television and radio to discuss the political issues of file sharing."

In the 2006 Swedish general election, the Pirate Party received 0.63% of the national vote.

=== Stepping down as party leader ===
On 1 January 2011, five years after founding the Pirate Party, Falkvinge announced his resignation as party leader. He took on the role of a political advocate. Deputy leader Anna Troberg succeeded him immediately. The announcement was made via a live broadcast.

In February 2016, Falkvinge became Head of Privacy for Private Internet Access, a US–based virtual private network (VPN) service.

== Media ==
In 2011, Foreign Policy magazine included him among its Top 100 Global Thinkers. In 2012, Time Magazine named him one of the world's most influential people, and in 2013, The Guardian listed him among the Top 20 Internet Freedom Fighters Worldwide.

Falkvinge has received recognition from international media and technology organizations for his political activism and advocacy work. In 2009, Swedish magazine Fokus listed him among the 100 most influential people in Sweden, and in 2010 he received the Guldmusen award as IT Person of the Year.

In 2011, Foreign Policy magazine included him among its Top 100 Global Thinkers. The following year, Time magazine named him one of its TIME 100 nominees, recognizing his role in turning the Pirate Party into an international movement with a presence in more than 25 countries. In 2013, The Guardian listed him among the Top 20 Internet Freedom Fighters Worldwide.

Since stepping down as party leader, Falkvinge has continued speaking at international conferences, including TEDx events in 2012 and 2013, and has appeared in podcasts and interviews discussing cryptocurrency, digital rights, and swarm organizing. As of 2024, he remains active in advocating for privacy and decentralized systems through his blog and public appearances.

== Published works ==
- Falkvinge, Rick (2013). Swarmwise: the tactical manual to changing the world. North Charleston, South Carolina, USA: CreateSpace Publishing Platform. ISBN 978-1481954099.
