= Young Pirates of Europe =

Organisation of the youth wings of the Pirate Parties in Europe

- Abbreviation: YPE
- Formation: 9 August 2013; 13 years ago
- Type: INGO
- Region served: Europe
- Members: European pirate youth organisations and other youth organisations that work on digital issues
- Official language: English
- President: Vid Bukovec
- Secretary-General: Maija Raudaskoski
- Main organ: European Pirates Instituted Council (EPIC)
- Website: young-pirates.eu

The Young Pirates of Europe (YPE) are a European federation of European pirate youth organisations and other youth organisations that work on digital issues, for transparency in government, participating democracy and civil rights.

The federation is a founding member and the youth organisation of the European Pirate Party (EPP). It is independent of the EPP, and it includes both Pirate and non-Pirate-affiliated member organisations. It was founded in August 2013 and as of 2017 is officially registered in Luxembourg. The association is managed by a board of up to 7 members.

== Initial creation ==
The YPE was founded as a non-profit organisation in Sweden.

== Organisational changes ==
It changed its registered seat several times. On 19 September 2014, the original Swedish organisation was disbanded and YPE was founded anew as a Belgian organisation. In this process, Mladí Piráti, the Czech pirate youth organisation as well as Junge Pirat*innen from Austria both became founding members. Ung Pirat, one of the original founding members, however, left the organisation because its delegates were not appointed to found a new organisation and vote on behalf of Ung Pirat in their assembly. On 21 August 2015, the organisation was refounded once more as a non-profit organisation with seat in Luxembourg with Junge Pirat*innen Österreichs (Austria), Piraattinuoret (Finland), Jeunes Pirates (France), Junge Piraten (Germany), Ungir Píratar (Iceland) and Ung Pirat (Sweden) as founding members. During its EPIC (General Assembly) 2016, Young Pirates of Europe accepted the membership request of Falanster (Belarus) and changed its goals and membership requirements to reflect its changed relationship to the European Pirate Parties. Starting from 2018, the "main goal of YPE" was defined as "bring[ing] together European pirate youth organisations and other youth organisations that work on digital issues and for transparency in government, participating democracy and civil rights as well as their members, improving not only the coordination of their political work, but also supporting cultural and personal exchange"; and member organisations no longer had to be affiliated with the Pirate Party in their home country as long as they support the policy goals of YPE.

At EPIC 2018, the accession of Mladí piráti (Czech Republic) and Mladi Pirati Slovenije (Slovenia), was approved, with the Czech MP and President of Mladí piráti, František Kopřiva (MP), becoming President. The same year, Jeunes Pirates' (France) membership was deemed to have lapsed due to their continued non-existence, and they were expelled from the organisation.

== Structure ==
Young Pirates of Europe is divided into two bodies: the Council and the Board.

The Council (European Pirates Instituted Council, EPIC) is the highest body of YPE. It meets annually and elects the Board and up to two auditors. In addition to the approval of the financial statements of the previous year and the budget for the coming year, it may decide on the discharge of the Board and the auditors. The Council also decides on the motions submitted by a member organisation or the Board. The voters of the Council consist of up to two delegates from each of the member organisations. An extraordinary meeting (EPIC FAIL) may be requested by the Board or one third of the members.

The Board consists of the President, a Treasurer, the Secretary General and up to four other members. The members of the Board may not be older than 29 years at the beginning of their term of office.

The President represents the Young Pirates of Europe in the public and takes care of the regular board meetings.

The Treasurer is responsible for the budget and the accounts of the organisation. For this purpose they shall report to the members semi-annually and examine the finances of the member associations.

The Secretary General represents the organisation towards its member organisations and organises most activities. For this, they inform them about the decisions of the Board and organise the meetings of EPIC.

== Members ==
- Czech Republic: Mladé Pirátstvo
- Finland: Piraattinuoret
- Germany: Europe beyond division (formerly Junge Piraten)
- Iceland: Ungir Píratar
- Slovenia: Mladi Pirati Slovenije
- Sweden: Ung Pirat

== Former presidium members ==
=== Presidents ===
- Felix Reda, MEP, 2014–15
- Arnaldur Sigurðarson, member of Reykjavík City Council, 2015–16
- Bernhard Hayden, 2016–18
- František Kopřiva, member of the Czech Chamber of Deputies, 2018–2021

=== Secretaries general ===
- Bernhard Hayden, 2015–16
- Henry Winckle, 2016–17, 2017–18
- Maija Li Raudaskoski, 2017
- Charalampos Kyritsis, 2018–

=== Treasurers ===
- Lukas Martini, 2015–18
- Magnus Hulterström, 2018–
