= Synovate =

Former market research company

- Used during the merger transition period in 2011–2012
- Type: Subsidiary
- Industry: Market research
- Headquarters: London, UK
- Key people: Adrian Chedore, Robert Philpott, CEO
- Services: Management consulting, business intelligence, market analysis
- Revenue: ▲US$816 million (Synovate Inc., 2009)
- Number of employees: 5,968 (Synovate Inc., 2009)
- Parent: Ipsos

Synovate was a market research company with more than 100 offices in 62 countries. It was acquired by Ipsos in 2011 which combined to be the third largest in the world.

== Company history ==
Synovate was one of the largest firms specializing in custom research (customized ad hoc research). They called themselves the most "curious" people in the world. Divisions included Synovate Healthcare, Synovate Business Consulting, Synovate Customer Experience, Synovate Censydiam and Motoresearch.

Synovate was owned by the Aegis Group. It was formed from the acquisition of a number of market research firms such as Blackstone, Market Facts, Censydiam, ISIS Research, Tribi, Symmetrics, Proactive Insights, and AMI.

Synovate was sold by the Aegis to Ipsos on 11 October 2011 for £525 million (€595 million) The combination of the 5th and 6th largest market research companies formed the 3rd largest market research company in the world with offices in 84 countries. Ipsos announced the agreement on 27 July 2011, and financed the acquisition through a new debt financing of €250 million. Synovate was fully integrated into Ipsos early in 2012.

== Aftermaths ==
Following the sale of Synovate, Aegis became a scaled media and digital communications specialist. It returned £200 million to shareholders via a special dividend, sharply reducing net debt from £393 million (in the end of 1st half of 2011) to £128 million (in November 2011).

Ipsos's post-merger revenue has declined every year since 2011. In 2013, Ipsos sued Aegis for £100 million compensation over deception on the sale of Synovate. The case was dismissed by the commercial court in 2015.

== Sales performance ==
Year	Company	Sales (million USD)	Year over year change
2009	Synovate (pre-merger)	816.4	-
2010	Synovate (pre-merger)	884.8	+8%
2011	Ipsos (year of merger)	2,495.0	+4%*
2012	Ipsos (post-merger)	2,301.1	-8%
2013	Ipsos (post-merger)	2,274.2	-1%
2014	Ipsos (post-merger)	2,219.9	-2%

* Calculated by using the combined Ipsos and Synovate pre-merger sales of US$2,397 million in 2010 (Ipsos's 2010 sales was US$1,512.8)
