= Pirate Party (Sweden) =

Swedish political party focused on information sharing

Pirate Party Piratpartiet
- The Pirate Party
- Leader: Mikael Enmalm
- Secretary-General: Kevin Stenberg
- Founder: Rick Falkvinge
- Founded: 1 January 2006
- Youth wing: Young Pirate
- Membership (15 March 2020): 1,884
- Ideology: Pirate politics
- European Parliament group: The Greens–European Free Alliance
- International affiliation: Pirate Parties International
- European political alliance: European Pirate Party
- Colours: Purple
- Parliament: 0 / 349
- European Parliament: 0 / 21
- County councils: 0 / 1,696
- Municipal councils: 0 / 12,700

Website
- piratpartiet.se

The Pirate Party (Swedish: Piratpartiet) is a political party in Sweden founded in 2006. Its sudden popularity has given rise to parties with the same name and similar goals across Europe and worldwide, forming the International Pirate Party movement.

The Pirate Party was initially formed to reform laws regarding copyright and patents. The party agenda includes support for strengthening the individual's right to privacy, both on the Internet and in everyday life, and the transparency of state administration. The Pirate Party has intentionally chosen to be bloc independent of the traditional left-right scale to pursue their political agenda with all mainstream parties. The party originally stayed neutral on other matters, but started broadening into other political areas in 2012.

The Pirate Party participated in the 2006 Riksdag elections and gained 0.63% of the votes, making them the third largest party outside parliament. In terms of membership, it passed the Green Party in December 2008, the Left Party in February 2009, the Liberal People's Party and the Christian Democrats in April 2009, and the Centre Party in May 2009, making it the third largest political party in Sweden by membership. The Pirate Party's associated youth organisation, Young Pirate (Swedish: Ung Pirat), was, for a part of 2009 and 2010, the largest political youth organisation in Sweden by membership count.

The Pirate Party came fifth in the 2009 European Parliament elections with 7.13% of the vote and one MEP (increasing to two after ratification of the Lisbon Treaty). Christian Engström became the first MEP for the party, and Amelia Andersdotter took the second seat on 1 December 2009.

Rick Falkvinge, founder of the party, stepped down on 1 January 2011 after five years as party leader, making vice leader Anna Troberg the party leader.

On 1 December 2014, Anna Troberg announced that she would not be available for re-election in 2015 after her term ended on 31 December 2014.

During the autumn meeting in 2024 Mikael Enmalm was elected party leader and Kevin Stenberg was elected secretary general of the party.

== Declaration of principles ==
The Pirate Party believes that people with an access to free communication, culture and knowledge grow, feel better and create a more enjoyable and humane society for everyone to live in. We see modern information technology opening up possibilities for people to take action for their own lives and participate in affecting the development of society. We see how a freer flow of information enables thoughts, cultural creation and the economy to grow.

— The Pirate Party's 4th declaration of principles

The party advocates a severe reduction of economic sole right of copyrighted works, which today exist for 70 years after the creator's death. They also advocate releasing all non-commercial sharing of copyrighted material, which means that all films, phonograms and programs can be shared freely as long as the operation isn't run commercially.

The party also has personal privacy as a core value, and is critical towards laws such as ACTA, IPRED, the Telecoms Package, and the change in legislation regulating the National Defence Radio Establishment (FRA).

The party advocates strengthened individual privacy, are against the Data Retention Directive, wants to elevate secrecy of correspondence to general secrecy of communication, and create a constitutional right to privacy. The party also seeks to modify the laws of intellectual property (copyright and patent), but doesn't want to change the laws of trademarks or industrial design rights. The party views itself as a defender of the individual's civil rights especially with regards to surveillance, government accountability and political and business corruption.

Before the Swedish general election of 2010, the party stayed neutral in all other political matters, and could be considered a single-issue party. After 2010 the party started opening up for a broader political agenda. A new declaration of principles was formed in 2011; at the spring member meeting in 2012, several new political standpoints were decided on areas such as school, research and health care.

The party has stated that it supports decriminalising the consumption of all currently illegal substances. It also supports legalising cannabis in Sweden through a regulated market by using state monopolies or licenses in a similar way to how alcohol and tobacco is regulated in the country. It says this would "deprive criminal organisations of income from drug sales and free up police resources that instead could be used to fight crimes with human victims."

== History ==
=== Founding ===
The website for the Pirate Party was launched on 1 January 2006 (at 20.30 CEST), marking the foundation of the Party. Six phases were presented on the website, with phase one being the collection of at least 2,000 signatures (500 more than required) to be handed over to the Swedish Election Authority before 4 February (the deadline for registering being February 28), so that the Party would be allowed to participate in the upcoming 17 September general election. In less than 24 hours after the opening of the website, the Party had collected over 2,000 signatures (2,268 at 16.05 CEST).

By the morning of 3 January, the Party closed the signature collection. In about 36 hours, they had gathered 4,725 signatures. As signatories are required by Swedish election law to identify themselves when giving support for a new party, international media reported this as a significant feat, given the nature of the Party. However, signatures presented to the election authorities are required to be handwritten. The goal of at least 1,500 handwritten signatures was reached February 10 and the final confirmation from the authorities was presented three days later. The Party claimed to have recruited 900 members within the first month, each member paying a membership fee of 5 Swedish kronor (approx. US$0.69, c.2006), payable by SMS (The Party has since changed to free member registration).

Phases two to five included registering with the Election Authority, getting candidates for the Riksdag, raising money for printing ballots, and preparing an organization for the election, including local organizations in all municipalities of Sweden with a population in excess of 50,000, which in 2005 meant 43 municipalities. During this phase fundraising was also started, with an initial goal of raising 1 million SEK ($126,409).

The sixth and final phase was the election itself. The Party, which claims that there are between 800,000 and 1.1 million active file sharers in Sweden, hoped that at least 225,000 (4% of all the voters in Sweden) of those would vote for the party, granting them membership in Parliament.

=== Initial media attention ===
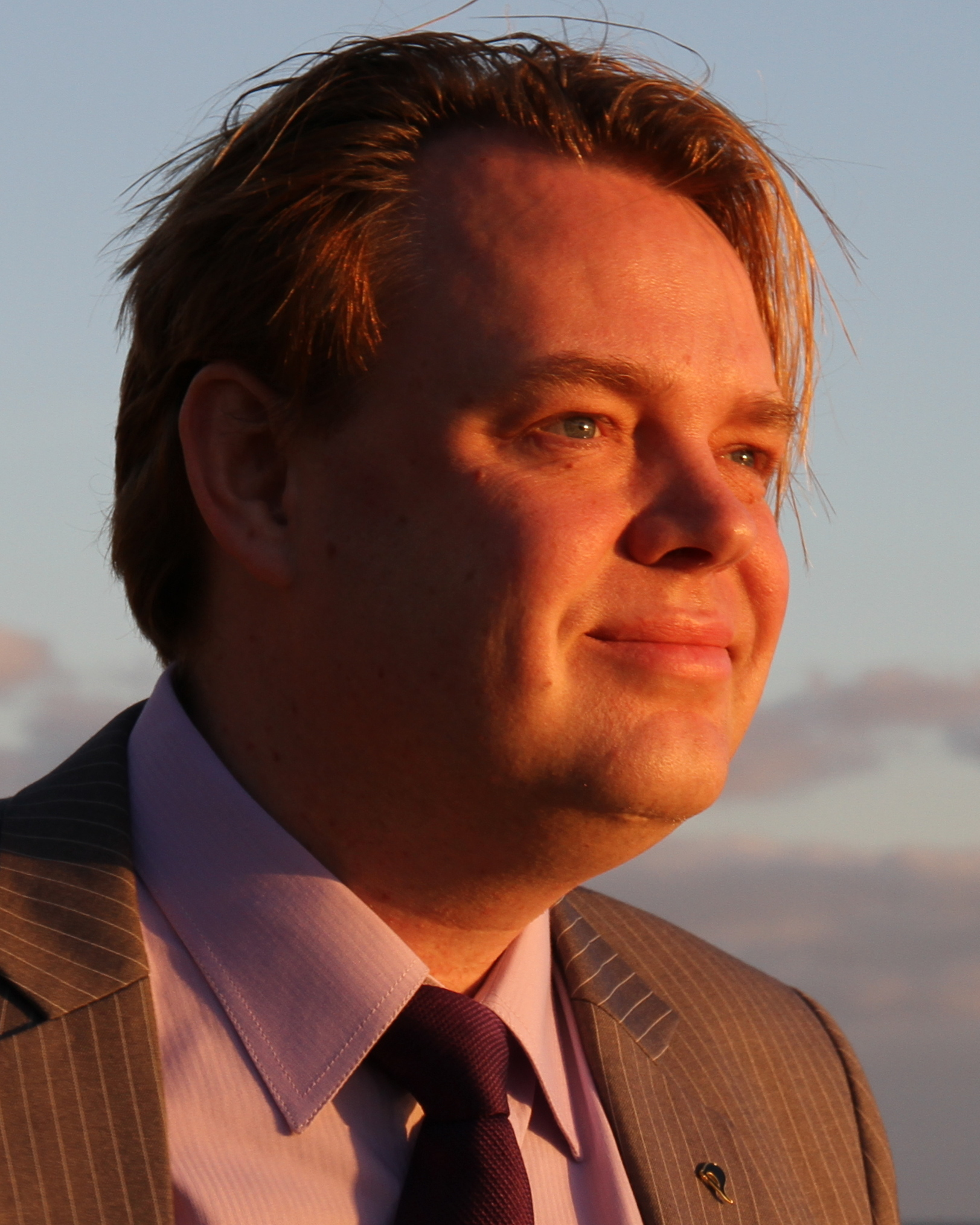
Rick Falkvinge, founder and party leader from 2006 to 2011

Media quickly picked up on the movement. On Monday 2 January 2006, a large Swedish financial newspaper, Dagens Industri, produced a story on what was happening. By 3 pm, the media seemed irritated that no owner of the website was listed or easy to track down; some reports listed the website as not serious and a PR stunt. However, the largest Swedish tabloid, Aftonbladet, managed to track down the Party leader Rickard Falkvinge at work. Falkvinge, however, was unable to explain the Party's positions while at work, bringing this information gathering effort to an abrupt end.

On 3 January 2006, all the major Swedish news outlets had produced stories on the Party. Aftonbladet posted an online poll indicating that its readers gave the Party a 61% approval rating, and IDG produced a longer front page interview with Falkvinge in the afternoon. IDG also posted an online poll similar to the first, with similar results. The Party website was also slashdotted.

The Pirate Party's web server received one million hits on its first day of operation, two million the next.

On 4 January, international media and radio stations picked up the story. A major Swedish radio station broadcast an interview with Falkvinge about the unexpected amount of attention the initiative received. More attention followed on Thursday, including coverage by the BBC World Service, the first global radio station to produce a story on the Pirate Party initiative.

At the end of the first week, the Pirate Party platform had been covered by over 500 English-language and over 600 Swedish-language media outlets.

=== The Pirate Bay trial ===
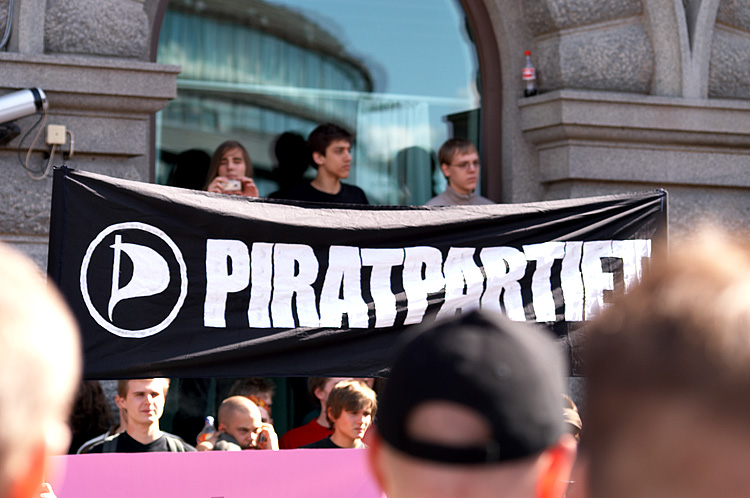
A Pirate Party banner at the demonstration held in Stockholm 3 June 2006.

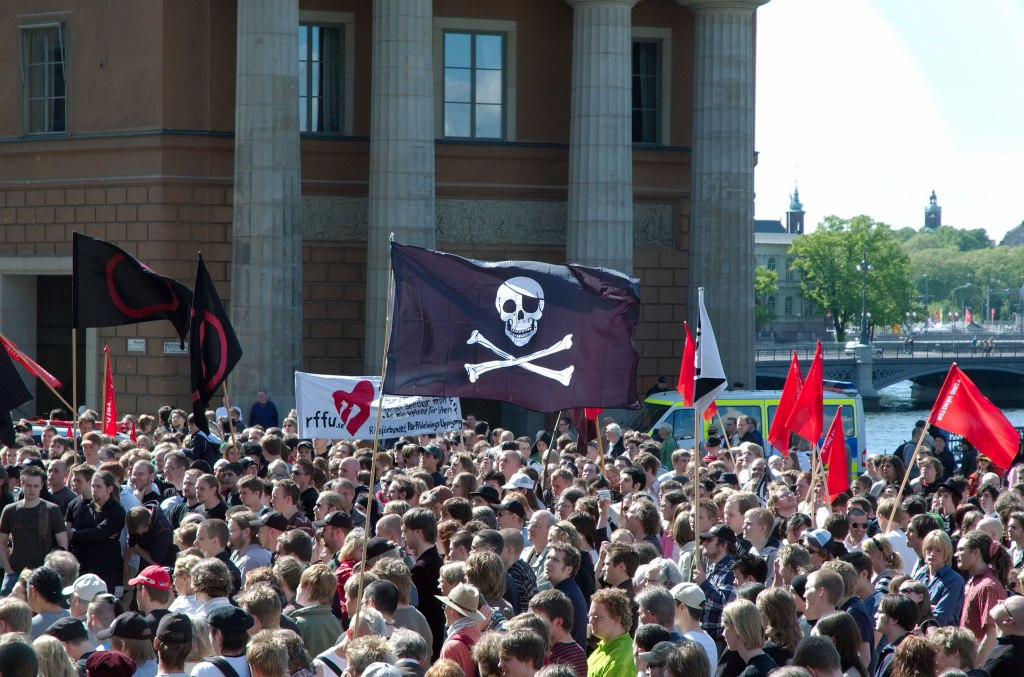
Crowd at the 3 June demonstration.

On 31 May 2006, Swedish police raided a facility hosting The Pirate Bay (and Piratbyrån, along with over 200 other independent site owners, hosted at the same facility), leading to a breakthrough for the Pirate Party in the public eye. Before the raid, the Party was steadily growing with some ten new members every day, but the raid caused a surge of 500 new members by the end of the day, with a membership count of 2,680. The next day another 930 people had registered membership, giving a total of 3,611 members, more than doubling their original number. During parts of 2006 Mikael Viborg, who is also known as the legal advisor of the popular BitTorrent tracker, The Pirate Bay was a board member of the Pirate Party.

On 3 June 2006, the Party performed a "pirate demonstration" in Stockholm and Gothenburg. The demonstration was in collaboration with the youth sections of some other political parties (the Young Liberals, Young Greens and Young Left). Within a few days the file sharing issue had become the focus of national debate, followed by national as well as international media. Along with criticizing the approach to restricting Pirate Bay's file sharing by the Minister for Justice Thomas Bodström, the right to free information and rule of law became the Party's main standpoints.

The Pirate Party had over 50,189 members as of 15 September 2009 – more members than 5 of the 7 parties in the Swedish Parliament – and was the third largest political party in Sweden by member count. Pirate Party's youth organisation, Young Pirate, had more than 21,800 members, making it the largest political youth organisation in Sweden. Since 17 April 2009, the party had more than tripled in size. Large increases in membership were associated with the controversial legislative change regulating signals intelligence, the IPRED law regarding copyright holder access to Internet service provider (ISP) subscriber information and the trial against The Pirate Bay. On 17 April 2009 the court reached a guilty verdict in the Pirate Bay trial and on the same day the Pirate Party gained 3,000 new members within 7 hours, making it larger in terms of members than 3 of the 7 parties in the Parliament of Sweden. A total of over 9,000 new members joined the party on that day and the day after. One week later it reached 40,000 members, compared to 15,000 members before the verdict.

On 30 April 2009, a newspaper election poll reported the Pirate Party vote to be 5.1% for the upcoming European Parliament election. Another more recent poll conducted by polling organization Demoskop for newspaper Upsala Nya Tidning gave the party 7.9%. The party eventually received 7.1% of the vote in the 7 June election, and won a seat in the European Parliament.

=== 2010s decade ===
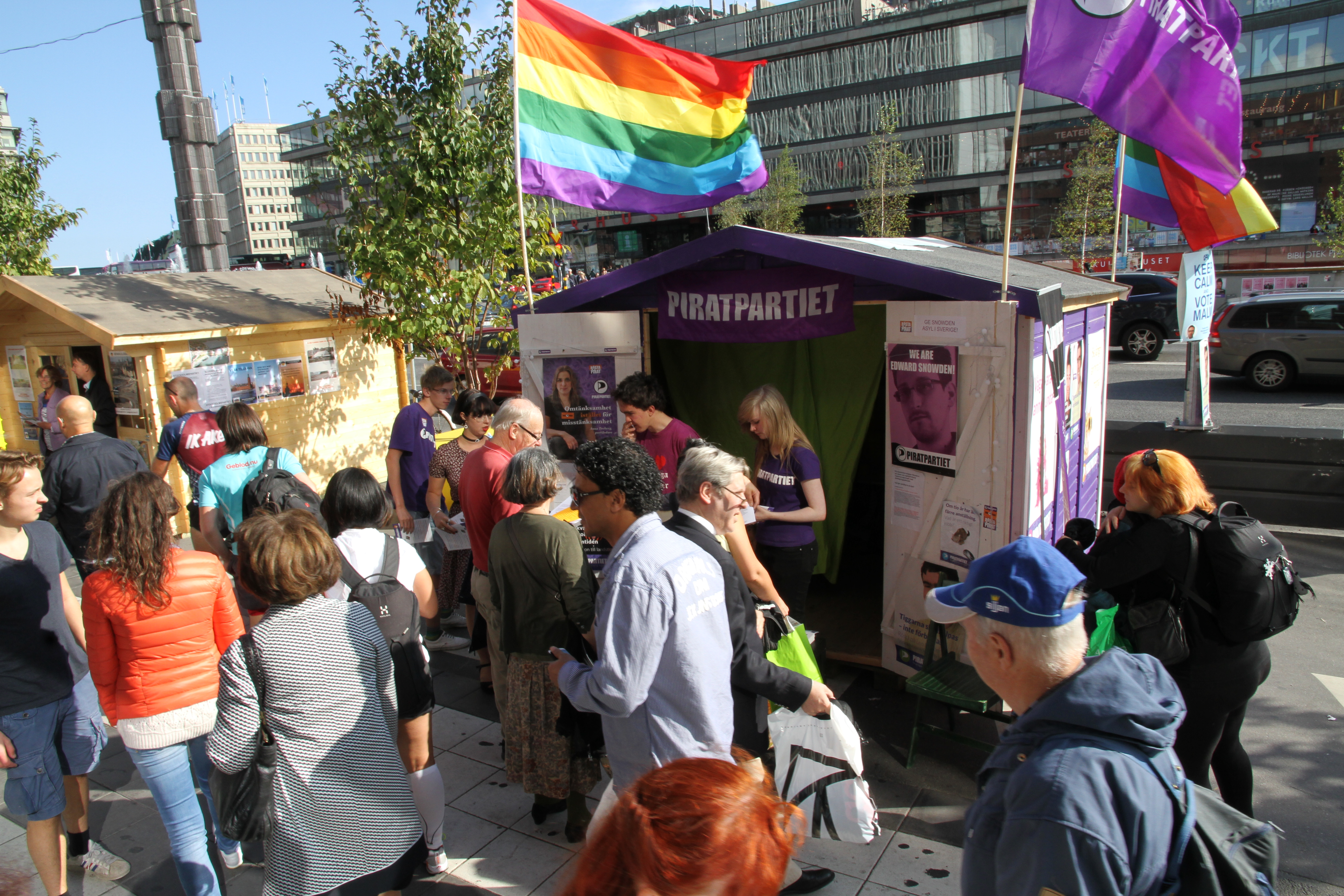
A Pirate Party election campaign cabin in September 2014

On 18 May 2010, The Pirate Bay started hosting its site through bandwidth delivered from the Pirate Party.

On 17 August 2010, it was announced that the Pirate Party will be hosting and managing many of WikiLeaks' new servers. The party donates servers and bandwidth to WikiLeaks without charge. Technicians of the party will make sure that the servers are maintained and working.

On 19 September 2010, the party won 0.7% of the votes in the 2010 general election, slightly increasing its performance in comparison to the 2006 general election.

On 1 January 2011, the party celebrated its five-year anniversary with a Bambuser live broadcast with party leader Rick Falkvinge and vice party leader Anna Troberg. Live in the video, Falkvinge sent a tweet saying he stepped down as party leader, and he announced that his successor would be Troberg. Falkvinge now works as an evangelist, spreading the politics of the Pirate Party in and out of Europe.

In December 2011, the party launched Free & Social, a social networking/microblogging service.

In the 2014 general election and the 2014 European Parliament election, the party won 0.4% respectively 2.2% of the votes and consequently lost their seats in the European Parliament. In the 2018 general election and the 2019 European Parliament election, the party won 0.1% respectively 0.6% of the votes.

After peaking at about 50,000 in late 2009, the membership numbers steadily declined to about 2,500 party members in early 2020.

== Political impact ==
=== National ===
Less than a week before the 2006 elections, the Green Party shifted their stance on copyright reform. Additionally, both the Moderate Party and the Left Party changed their stances on internet downloads, and both prime ministerial candidates stated publicly that it shouldn't be illegal for young people to share files. Several influential analysts have credited the Pirate Party and its rising popularity for this shift in the political climate; these include a panel of senior editors at International Data Group and political analysts at the largest morning newspaper, Dagens Nyheter. Additionally, the then Swedish Minister of Justice Thomas Bodström, announced on 9 June that he was willing to negotiate a possible revision of the law introduced in 2005 that made unauthorised downloading of copyrighted material illegal, introducing a new tax on broadband Internet access, but he later denied having changed his stance on the issue.

After the 2006 elections, the issue faded from the public debate. In January 2008, seven Swedish members of parliament from the conservative Moderate Party, senior member of the governing Alliance coalition, authored a piece in a Swedish tabloid calling for the complete decriminalisation of filesharing. The Swedish members of parliament wrote that "Decriminalising all non-commercial file sharing and forcing the market to adapt is not just the best solution. It's the only solution, unless we want an ever more extensive control of what citizens do on the Internet."

=== International ===
Elected in EU Parliament Elected nationally Elected locally Registered for elections Registered in some administrative regions Unregistered but active Status unknown

Outside Sweden, pirate parties have been started in some 33 countries, inspired by the Swedish initiative. They cooperate through Pirate Parties International (PPI).

The Pirate Party of Germany gained seats in the city council of Münster and Aachen in August 2009, and in the federal election a month later they received 2.0% of the party list votes, becoming the biggest party outside the Bundestag. In the election to the Abgeordnetenhaus in Berlin in September 2011, the Pirate Party received 9% of the votes and, for the first time in Germany, gained seats in a state parliament.

=== Free software ===
Richard Stallman has expressed concern that the Pirate Party's goal of reducing copyright term to 5 years could harm the free software movement. Many free software licenses, mainly the GPL, are based on long-term copyrights. Stallman argues that if copyright terms are reduced to 5 years, proprietary software vendors would be able to take free software and use it in proprietary software once the copyright expires. But proprietary software is restricted by EULAs in addition to copyright, and the source code is not available, rendering the proprietary software unusable for free software developers even after its copyright expires. Stallman suggests that under this new copyright law, proprietary software developers should put their code in escrow when the software's binaries are released and then release their software into the public domain immediately after their copyright expires.

== Election results, voter base ==
=== 2006 Swedish general election ===
The Pirate Party attracted 34,918 votes in the Swedish general election of 2006, their first participation at an election for parliament since the founding of the party less than 9 months prior. With 0.63% of the overall votes, it became the 10th biggest party of more than 40 participating. However, a voting result of less than 4% of the total votes does not qualify the party for seats in the Swedish Parliament. Getting more than 1% of the vote would have granted the party financial assistance from the state for printing ballots which is costly in Sweden, while at least 2.5% would grant them state funds for campaigning in the next election. Despite the setbacks, Falkvinge began planning for the Swedish general election in 2010.

=== 2009 European Parliament election ===
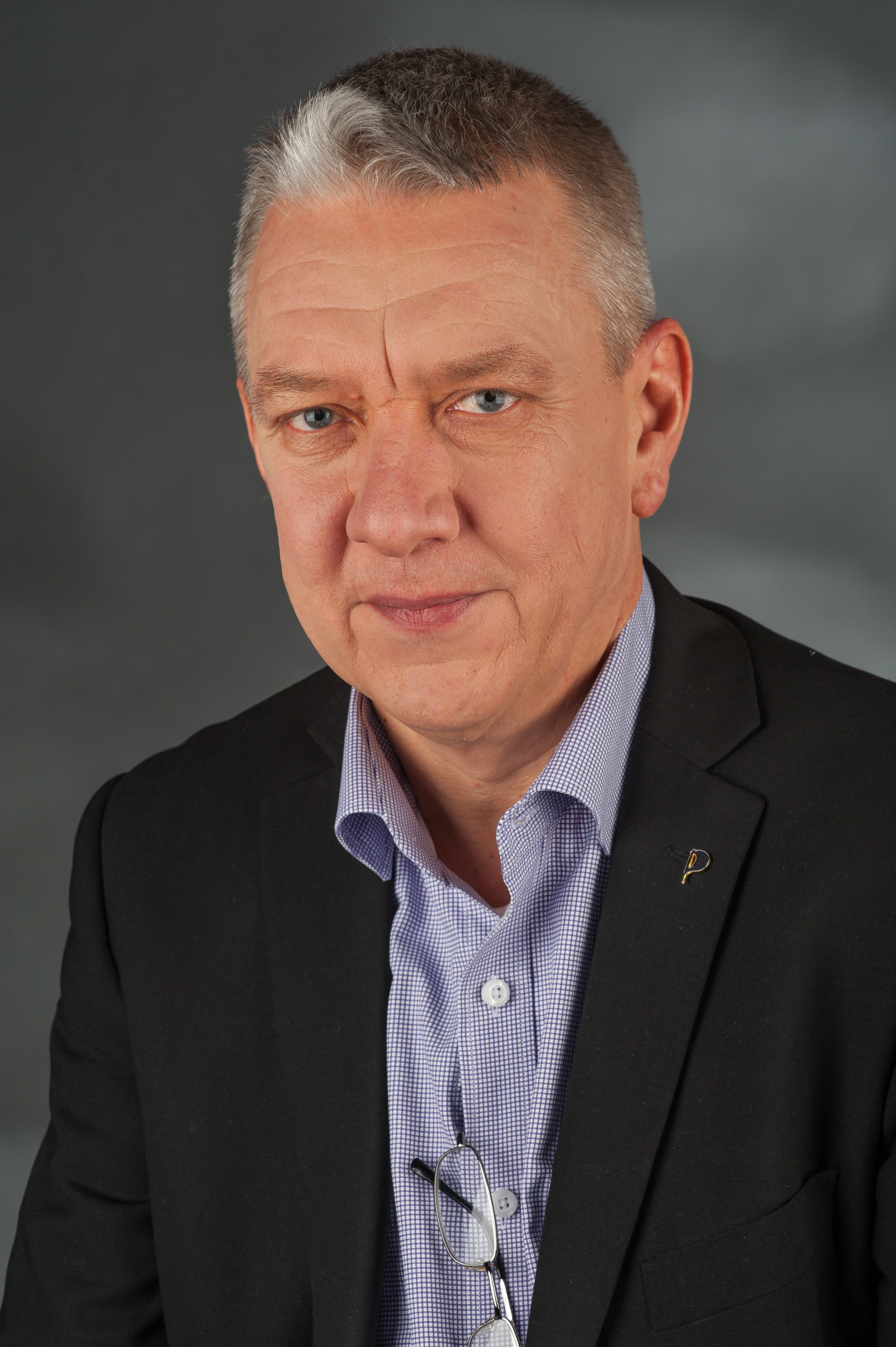
Christian Engström MEP

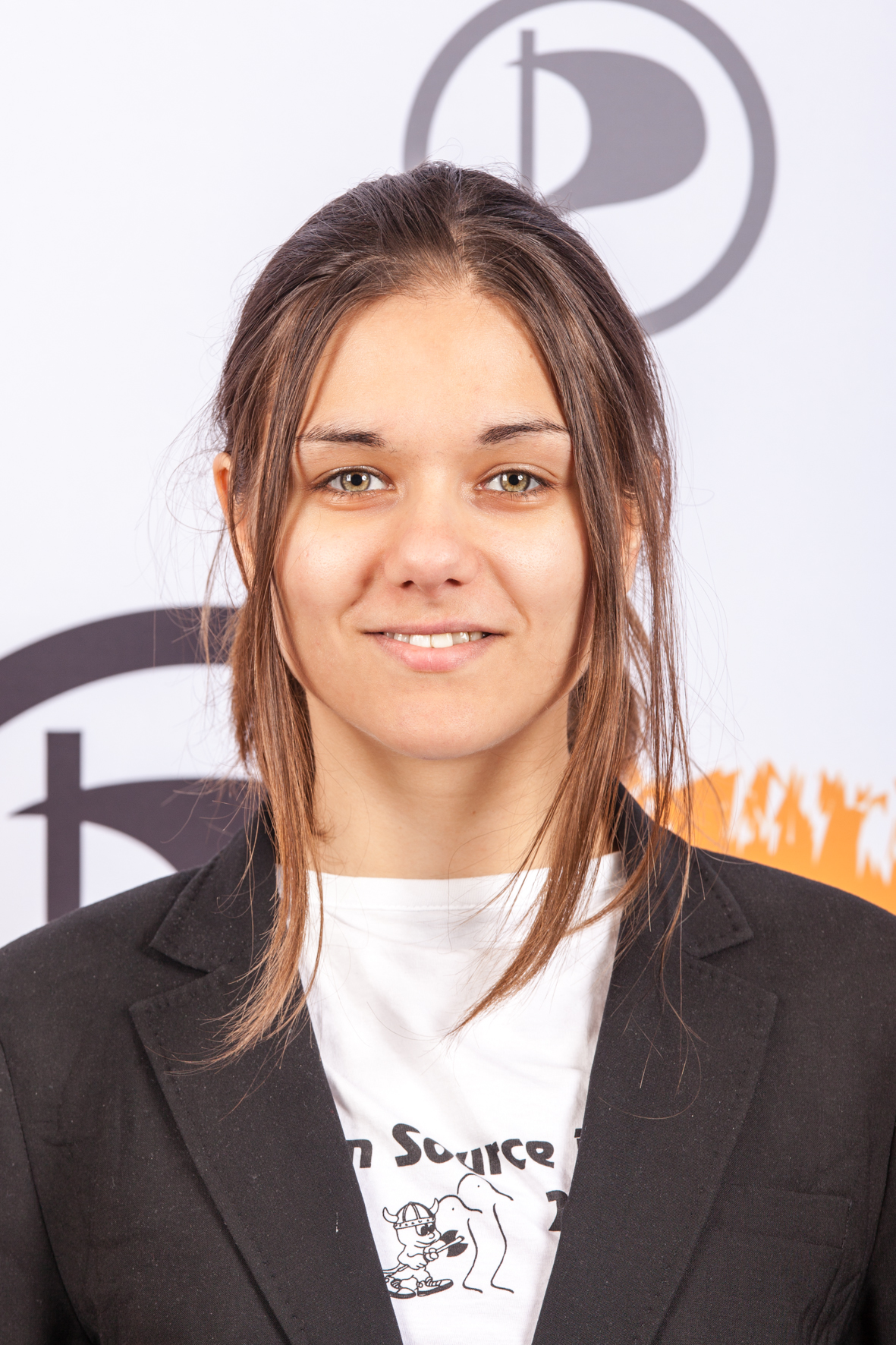
Amelia Andersdotter MEP

In the first pre-election poll before the 2009 European Parliament election, the Pirate Party registered at 5.1%, which would be enough to get a seat in the parliament. The support for the party was concentrated among younger voters, especially those of ages 18–29 (where it was the second largest party) and 30–44 (where it was the fourth largest).

By 22 May 2009, a Demoskop poll showed a 7.9% support amongst Swedish voters, making the Pirate Party the third largest party. A week later this had grown to 8.2% and a projected two seats in Parliament, with 21.8% support amongst people aged 18–29. The party's top two candidates were Christian Engström and Amelia Andersdotter.

A model-based prediction for the 2009 European Parliament election by political scientists estimated on 4 June 2009 that the Pirate Party could be the third largest party from Sweden, gaining 2 seats.

The Pirate Party got enough votes for at least one seat of the 18 available seats Sweden then had at the European Parliament, getting 7.1% of the Swedish votes. Following the ratification of the Treaty of Lisbon, a second seat was given to Amelia Andersdotter on December 1, 2009. The Pirate Party joined The Greens-European Free Alliance group.

The Pirate Party of Germany also participated in the European Parliament elections, which was their first participation in a nationwide election, and achieved 0.9% in Germany, getting 230,000 votes. They missed the 5% level by a wide margin but qualified for public funding.

=== 2010 election ===
In the 2010 general election, the Pirate Party increased their percentage of the vote by 0.02%, bringing it to a total of 0.65%, remaining under the required amount to gain a seat, but becoming the biggest party outside of Parliament.

=== Parliament (Riksdag) ===
Year	Votes	%	Seats	+/-	Government
2006	34,918	0.6 (#10)	0 / 349	New	No seats
2010	38,491	0.7 (#9)	0 / 349	0	No seats
2014	26,515	0.4 (#10)	0 / 349	0	No seats
2018	7,326	0.11 (#12)	0 / 349	0	No seats
2022	9,135	0.14 (#12)	0 / 349	0	No seats
2026	7,464	0.11 (#13)	0 / 349	0	No seats

=== European Parliament ===
Election	List leader	Votes	%	Seats	+/–	EP Group
2009	Christian Engström	225,915	7.13 (#5)	1 / 18 2 / 20	New ▲1	Greens/EFA
2014	Unclear	82,763	2.23 (#10)	0 / 20	▼2	–
2019	Unclear	26,526	0.64 (#10)	0 / 20	0	–
2024	Katarina Stensson	15,403	0.37 (#11)	0 / 21	0	–

== Relations to other Swedish pirate organizations ==
There are three major pirate organisations in Sweden: the political Pirate Party, the now-defunct NGO Piratbyrån (Pirate Bureau), and the BitTorrent tracker The Pirate Bay. Of these three, Piratbyrån and The Pirate Bay share a common history but are now separate, whereas the Pirate Party developed on a completely separate and parallel track, founded by Falkvinge, and was initially unrelated to the other two. This was until 18 May 2010, when the Pirate Party became The Pirate Bay's ISP in response to an injunction that temporarily shut down access to The Pirate Bay, with the Pirate Party stating that "It is time to take the bull by the horns and stand up for what we believe is a legitimate activity."

== See also ==
- Anti-Counterfeiting Trade Agreement (ACTA)
- Elections in Sweden
- EU Copyright Directive and DADVSI
- 2009 European Parliament election in Sweden
- National Defence Radio Establishment (FRA)
- Patent pirate
- Piratbyrån
- Pirate Parties International
- Politics of Sweden
- The Pirate Bay
