= Anna Troberg =

Swedish translator, author and politician (born 1974)

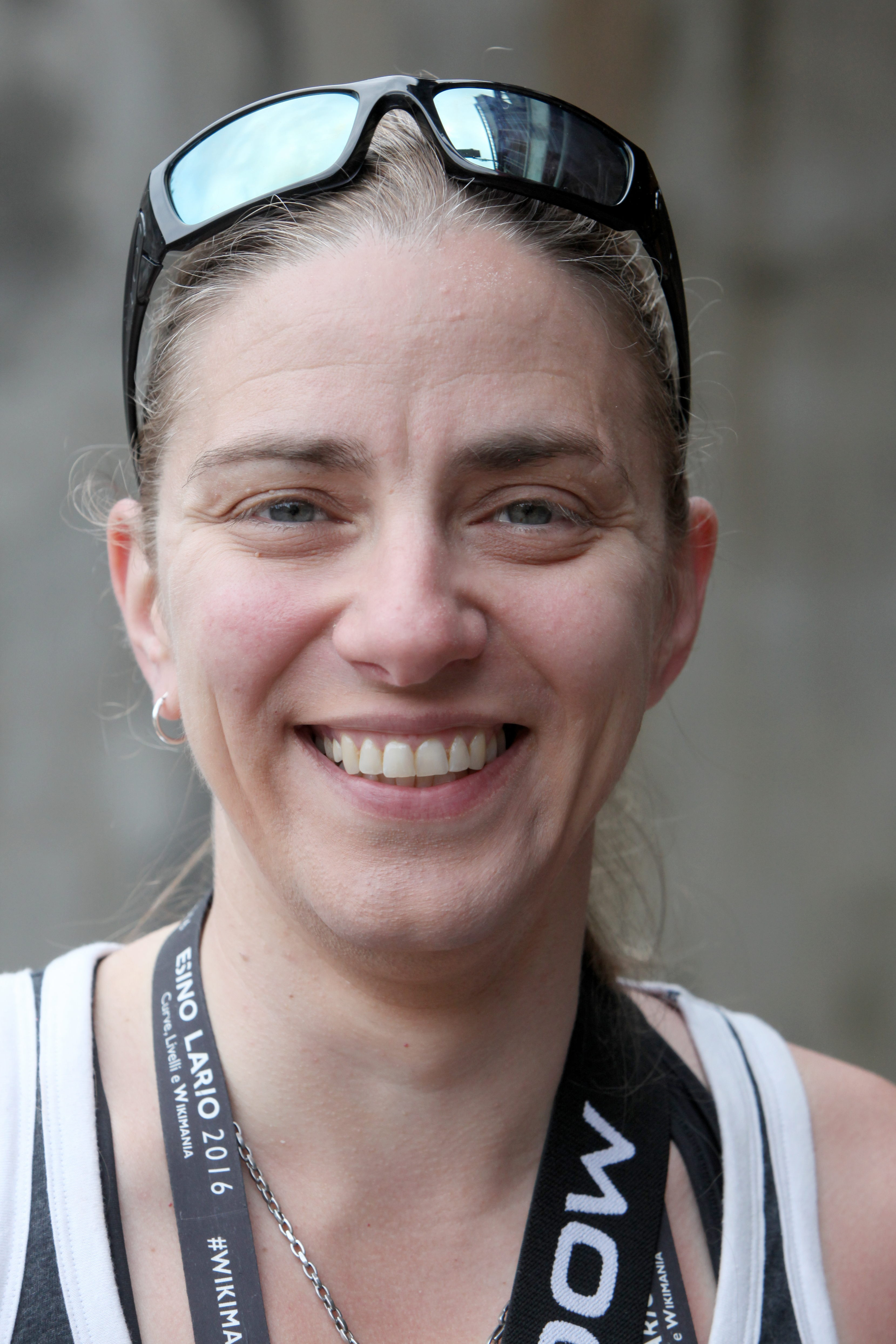
- Troberg at Wikimania 2016

Leader of the Pirate Party
- In office 1 January 2011 – 2 May 2016
- Monarch: Carl XVI Gustaf
- Prime Minister: Fredrik Reinfeldt; Stefan Löfven
- Preceded by: Rick Falkvinge
- Succeeded by: Magnus Andersson

Personal details
- Born: Anna Troberg; 9 April 1974 (age 52) Landskrona, Sweden
- Party: Pirate Party
- Occupation: Author, politician
- Website: annatroberg.se

Anna Troberg (born 9 April 1974) is a translator, author, and former party leader of the Swedish Pirate Party.

== Early life and career ==
Troberg was born in Landskrona but moved to Borlänge at a young age.

She worked as the head of the Swedish branch of a publishing house.

On 22 December 2015, Wikimedia Sweden announced Troberg as the new operations manager of Wikimedia Sweden effective 6 January 2016. In March 2017 she left that position to become the working chair of the Swedish union for employees in libraries, archives and museums.

== Pirate Party ==
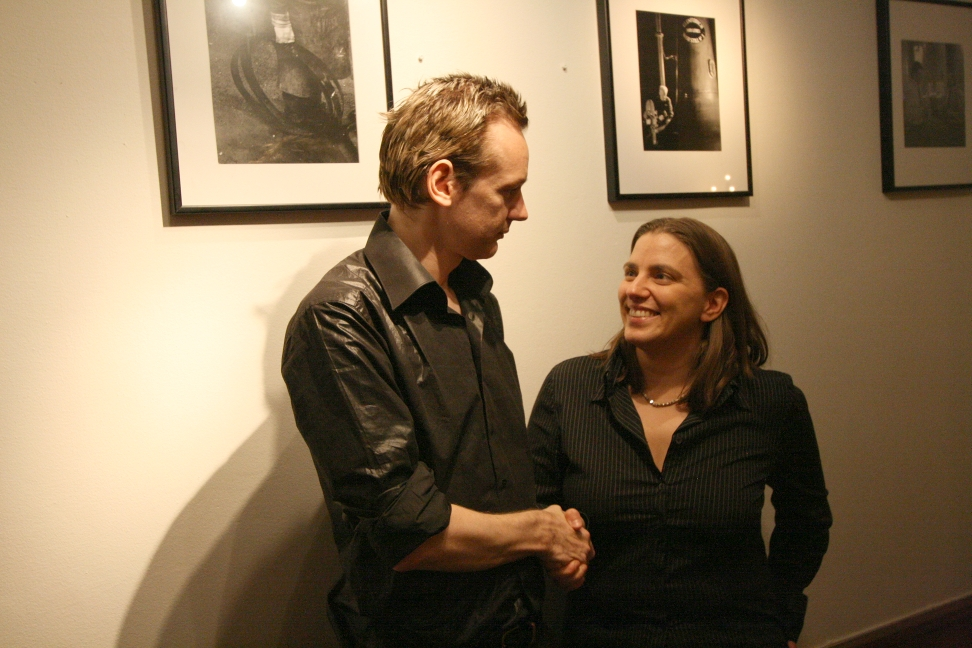
Troberg and Julian Assange

Troberg's entry into the Pirate Party has been described as a complete ideological turnaround from the stances associated with her previous publishing career. She challenged the pirates with questions on her blog, and getting them answered to satisfaction, she decided that the pirates were right and that technology had superseded much of copyright law.

Following this, she was invited to become active in the party at management level and was appointed deputy party leader in 2009. Having worked closely with the previous party leader Rick Falkvinge for 18 months, she stepped up to the party leader position as he resigned on 1 January 2011.

She considered one of her most important tasks to add more compassion to pirate politics and go beyond the technical focus.

Troberg was considered to have a more polished appearance than her predecessor.

== Bibliography ==
Troberg at the Gothenburg book fair 2012

Caricaturing her career in the publishing business, she wrote released the novel Chefer från helvetet ("Bosses from Hell") under the pseudonym Rosetta Sten (which directly translates to Rosetta Stone in Swedish).

Troberg is credited with translating 25 works into Swedish. Some are Andy Riley's books about Bunny Suicides, Sharon Osbourne's autobiography Extreme, Chris Bradford's Young Samurai novels, Simon Lewis's Bad Traffic and several novels by Jeanette Winterson (Oranges Are Not the Only Fruit, Lighthousekeeping and The Passion).
