= Young Pirates (Germany) =

Former youth organisation of the Pirate Party Germany

Young Pirates Junge Piraten (JuPis)
- Secretary General: Yannick Schuerdt
- Treasurer: Enno Tensing
- Founded: 18 April 2009
- Headquarters: Berlin
- Ideology: Pirate politics
- Mother party: Pirate Party Germany
- International affiliation: Young Pirates of Europe, Pirate Parties International
- Website: www.jungepiraten.de

Young Pirates (German: Junge Piraten, JuPis) is a youth organisation of the Pirate Party of Germany. The organisation was founded in Wiesbaden on 18 April 2009, when the first board of directors was elected. Then-15-year-old Carmelito Bauer was the first elected chairperson. Since then the board is elected yearly by the present members on their federal meeting. At the first federal meeting of members in 2009 the construction of the board of directors was changed. Since then it has included seven board members, the chairperson and its deputy, the secretary general, the treasurer as well as three assessors.

== Structure ==
The structure of the board has again been significantly altered at the regular general assembly in March 2014. It is now divided into the administrative council, consisting of the treasurer and secretary general, and two or more spokespersons. The spokespersons' explicit purpose is to represent the organisation politically.

At the same general assembly, a 50% quota of females in the spokespersons' council has been decided upon. The decision remains controversial within the Young Pirates.

Regional organisations exist in Lower Saxony, North Rhine-Westphalia, Schleswig-Holstein, Hamburg, Thuringia, Saxony and Berlin.

No membership to the mother party is necessary. There exists no minimum age for a membership, but an age limit of 28 years (membership ends with the 28th birthday). This limit does not apply to honorary members.

== See also ==
- Young Pirate (Ung Pirat), Sweden
- Young Pirates of Europe
