= Young Pirate =

Youth organisation of the Pirate Party Sweden

Young Pirate Ung Pirat
- Chairperson: Gabriel Karlsson
- Secretary General: Victor Andersson
- Founded: 2006
- Ideology: Pirate politics
- Mother party: Pirate Party
- International affiliation: Young Pirates of Europe, Pirate Parties International
- Website: ungpirat.se

Young Pirate (Swedish: Ung Pirat) is the youth organisation of the Swedish Pirate Party. It was founded in December 2006 and had, from April 2009 until spring 2010, over 22,000 members. It was by far the largest political youth organisation by member count in Sweden.

== See also ==
- Young Pirates (Junge Piraten), Germany
- Young Pirates of Europe
