= List of Pirate Parties =

Outside Sweden, pirate parties have been started in over 60 countries, inspired by the Swedish initiative.

== National pirate parties ==
Country	Name	Domestic registration status	Member of Pirate Parties International	Member of European Pirate Party	Elected	Continent
Argentina	Partido Interdimensional Pirata	Active but unregistered	No	No	No	South America
Australia	Pirate Party Australia	Active. Deregistered as an individual party, but a constituent member of the registered Fusion Party.	No	No	No	Oceania
Austria	Piratenpartei Österreichs	Officially registered	Yes	Yes	Two city councillors	Europe
Belarus	The Pirates Center of Belarus	Active but unregistered	Yes	No	No	Europe
Belarus	Пиратское движение Беларуси	Active but unregistered	Yes	No	No	Europe
Belgium	Piratenpartij / Parti pirate	No official registration required	Yes	Yes	No	Europe
Bosnia and Herzegovina	Piratska Partija Bosne i Hercegovine	Unclear	Yes	No	No	Europe
Brazil	Partido Pirata	Active, in the process of registration	Yes	No	No	South America
Bulgaria	Пиратска Партия	Officially registered	Yes	No	No	Europe
Canada	Pirate Party of Canada / Parti Pirate du Canada	Defunct	No	No	No	North America
China	Pirate Party of China (中国盗版党)	Discussions on forming group	—N/a	—N/a	—N/a	Asia
Chile	Partido Pirata de Chile	Active but unregistered	Yes	No	No	South America
Colombia	Partido Pirata Colombiano	Discussions on forming group	—N/a	—N/a	—N/a	South America
Costa Rica	Partido Pirata de Costa Rica	Discussions on forming group	—N/a	—N/a	—N/a	North America
Croatia	Pirate Party Croatia / Piratska Stranka Hrvatske	Officially registered	Yes	Yes	2 communal councillors	Europe
Cyprus	Pirate Party Cyprus	Active but unregistered	No	No	No	Europe
Czech Republic	Česká pirátská strana	Officially registered	Yes	Yes	16 state parliament seats 279 city/municipal councillors 3 regional councillors 1 member of the Senate; 1 member of the European Parliament	Europe
Denmark	Piratpartiet	Officially registered	Yes	No	No	Europe
Estonia	Eesti Piraadipartei	Officially registered	Yes	Yes	No	Europe
Finland	Piraattipuolue	Active but unregistered	Yes	Yes	No	Europe
France	Parti Pirate	Officially registered	Yes	Yes	2 city/municipal council seats	Europe
Germany	Piratenpartei Deutschland	Officially registered	Yes	Yes	247 city/municipal council seats	Europe
Greece	Κόμμα Πειρατών Ελλάδας	Officially registered	No	No	No	Europe
Hungary	Magyar Kalózpárt	Under transformation from NGO to an official political party, worked together with Politics Can Be Different (LMP)	No	No	Indirectly (LMP has 16 MPs in the Hungarian Parliament)	Europe
Honduras	Pirate Party of Honduras/Partido Pirata de Honduras	Discussions on forming group	—N/a	No	No	North America
Iceland	Píratar	Officially registered	Yes	Yes	4 municipal seats	Europe
India	Pirate Party of India	Active but unregistered	No	No	—N/a	Asia
Ireland	Pirate Party Ireland / Páirtí Foghlaithe na hÉireann	Active but unregistered	Founding member, removed in June 2012	No	No	Europe
Israel	Piratim/הפיראטים	Officially registered	Yes	No	No	Asia
Italy	Partito Pirata	Officially registered	Yes	Yes	No	Europe
Japan	Pirate Party Japan (日本海賊党)	Officially registered	Yes	Observer	No	Asia
Kazakhstan	Пиратская Партия Казахстана / Қазақстан Қарақшылар Партиясы	Active but unregistered	Yes	No	No	Asia
Latvia	Pirātu Partija	Active but unregistered	Yes	No	No	Europe
Lebanon	Pirate Party Lebanon - حزب القراصنة لبنان	Active, in the process of registration	No	No	No	Asia
Lithuania	Lietuvos Piratų Partija	Active but unregistered	No	No	No	Europe
Luxembourg	Piratepartei Lëtzebuerg	Officially registered	Yes	Yes	Yes	Europe
Malaysia	Malaysia Pirate Party	Discussions on forming group, now inactive	—N/a	—N/a	—N/a	Asia
Mexico	Partido Pirata Mexicano	Active but unregistered	No	No	No	North America
Montenegro	Piratska Partija Crne Gore	Officially registered	No	No	No	Europe
Morocco	Pirate Party of Morocco	Active but unregistered	Yes	No	No	Africa
Nepal	Pirate Party Nepal	Eligible to register after gathering 10,000 signatures before national election	No	No	No	Asia
Netherlands	Piratenpartij Nederland	Officially registered	Yes	Yes	No	Europe
New Zealand	Pirate Party of New Zealand	Active but unregistered	Yes	No	No	Oceania
Norway	Pirate Party of Norway	Officially registered	Yes	Yes	No	Europe
Peru	Partido Pirata de Perú	Letter of notification that party is forming	—N/a	—N/a	—N/a	South America
Philippines	Philippine Pirate Movement	Officially registered	—N/a	—N/a	—N/a	Asia
Poland	Polska Partia Piratów	Officially registered	Yes	Yes	No	Europe
Portugal	Partido Pirata Português	Active but unregistered	Yes	No	No	Europe
Romania	Partidul Pirat România	Active but unregistered	Yes	Yes	No	Europe
Russia	Пиратская партия России	Active, registering a political party	Yes	No	No	Europe
Serbia	Piratska Partija Srbije	Dissolved	Yes	No	No	Europe
Slovakia	Slovenská pirátska strana	Not active	Yes	No	No	Europe
Slovakia	Pirátska strana - Slovensko|Pirátska strana - Slovensko	Yes	Yes	Yes	No	Europe
Slovenia	Piratska stranka Slovenije	Officially registered	Yes	Yes	No	Europe
South Africa	South African Pirate Party	No	—N/a	No	No	Africa
Spain	Partido Pirata	No	Yes	—N/a	No	Europe
Sweden	Piratpartiet	Officially registered	Observer Member	Yes	No	Europe
Switzerland	Piratenpartei Schweiz / Parti Pirate Suisse / Partito Pirata Svizzera / Partida da Pirats Svizra	Officially registered	Yes	Yes	One city council seat, one mayor	Europe
Taiwan	台灣海盜黨 Pirate Party of Taiwan	The government forbid use of 海盜(Pirate) in its party name.'	—N/a	—N/a	—N/a	Asia
Tunisia	Pirate Party of Tunisia	Officially registered	Yes	No	No	Africa
Tunisia	Tunisian Pirate Party	Officially registered	No	No	No	Africa
Turkey	Korsan Parti Türkiye	Active but unregistered	Yes	No	No	Europe
Ukraine	Pirate Party Of Ukraine / Піратська Партія України	Active but unregistered	Yes	No	No	Europe
United Kingdom	Pirate Party UK / Plaid Môr-leidr DU	Officially registered	No	No	No	Europe
United States	United States Pirate Party	Registered in eight states	No	No	No	North America
Uruguay	Partido Pirata en Uruguay	Active but unregistered	No	No	No	South America
Venezuela	Partido Pirata de Venezuela	Discussions on forming group	—N/a	—N/a	—N/a	South America

== Super-national pirate parties ==
Country	Name	Status	Member of Pirate Parties International	Elected
EU	European Pirate Party	Registered	No	1 MEP
African Union	African Pirate Party	Active but unregistered	No	No

== Sub-national and regional pirate parties ==
Country	Name	Domestic registration status	Member of Pirate Parties International	Member of European Pirate Party	Elected
Australia	(Australian Capital Territory) Pirate Party ACT	Active but unregistered	No	No	No
Austria	(Salzburg (state)) Salzburger Piratenpartei	Officially registered	Indirectly through PPAT	Indirectly through PPAT	No
Austria	(Tyrol (federal state)) Piraten Partei Tirol	Officially registered	Observer Member	Indirectly through PPAT	One city councillor
Austria	(Upper Austria) Piratenpartei Oberösterreich	Officially registered	Indirectly through PPAT	Indirectly through PPAT	No
Austria	(Styria) Piratenpartei Steiermark	Officially registered	Indirectly through PPAT	Indirectly through PPAT	One city councillor
Bosnia and Herzegovina	(Republika Srpska) Piratska Partija	Unclear	No	No	No
Germany	Piratenpartei Baden-Württemberg	Officially registered	Indirectly through PPDE	Indirectly through PPDE	5 city/municipal council seats
Germany	(Bavaria) Piratenpartei Bayern	Officially registered	Observer Member	Indirectly through PPDE	5 city/municipal council seats
Germany	Piratenpartei Berlin	Officially registered	Observer Member	Indirectly through PPDE	4 city/municipal council seats
Germany	Piratenpartei Brandenburg	Officially registered	Indirectly through PPDE	Indirectly through PPDE	7 city/municipal council seats
Germany	(Bremen (state)) Piratenpartei Bremen	Officially registered	Indirectly through PPDE	Indirectly through PPDE	5 city/municipal council seats
Germany	Piratenpartei Hamburg	Officially registered	Indirectly through PPDE	Indirectly through PPDE	4 city/municipal council seats
Germany	(Hesse) Piratenpartei Hessen	Officially registered	Observer Member	Indirectly through PPDE	33 city/municipal council seats
Germany	Piratenpartei Mecklenburg-Vorpommern	Officially registered	Indirectly through PPDE	Indirectly through PPDE	2 city/municipal council seats
Germany	(North Rhine-Westphalia) Piratenpartei Nordrhein-Westfalen	Officially registered	Indirectly through PPDE	Indirectly through PPDE	11 city/municipal council seats
Germany	(Lower Saxony) Piratenpartei Niedersachsen	Officially registered	Observer Member	Indirectly through PPDE	66 city/municipal council seats
Germany	(Rhineland-Palatinate) Piratenpartei Rheinland-Pfalz	Officially registered	Indirectly through PPDE	Indirectly through PPDE	1 city/municipal council seats
Germany	Piratenpartei Saarland	Officially registered	Indirectly through PPDE	Indirectly through PPDE	No
Germany	(Saxony) Piratenpartei Sachsen	Officially registered	Indirectly through PPDE	Indirectly through PPDE	3 city/municipal council seats
Germany	(Saxony-Anhalt) Piratenpartei Sachsen-Anhalt	Officially registered	Indirectly through PPDE	Indirectly through PPDE	3 city/municipal council seats
Germany	Piratenpartei Schleswig-Holstein	Officially registered	Indirectly through PPDE	Indirectly through PPDE	2 city/municipal council seats
Germany	(Thuringia) Piratenpartei Thüringen	Officially registered	Indirectly through PPDE	Indirectly through PPDE	2 city/municipal council seats
United States	California Pirate Party	Active but unregistered	No	No	No
United States	Florida Pirate Party	Officially registered	Observer Member	No	No
United States	(Georgia (U.S. state)) Georgia Pirate Party	Active but unregistered	No	No	No
United States	Pirate Party of Hawaii	Discussions on forming group	No	No	No
United States	Michigan Pirate Party	Discussions on forming group	No	No	No
United States	Maryland Pirate Party	Discussions on forming group	No	No	No
United States	Massachusetts Pirate Party	Officially registered	No	No	No
United States	Minnesota Pirate Party	Discussions on forming group	No	No	No
United States	(New York (state)) New York Pirate Party	Active but unregistered	No	No	No
United States	Oklahoma Pirate Party	Active but unregistered	No	No	No
United States	Oregon Pirate Party	Active but unregistered	No	No	No
United States	San Francisco Pirate Party	Active but unregistered	No	No	No
United States	(Washington (state)) Washington Pirate Party	Active but unregistered	No	No	No
United States	Wisconsin Pirate Party	Active and registered	No	No	No
Spain	(Catalonia) Pirates de Catalunya	Officially registered	Yes	Yes	Two municipal councilors
Spain	(Galicia (Spain)) Piratas de Galicia	Officially registered	Applying for observer membership	No	No
Spain	Piratas de La Rioja	Officially registered	Observer Member	No	No
Spain	(Community of Madrid) Piratas de Madrid	Officially registered	No	No	No
Spain	Piratas de Extremadura	Officially registered	No	No	No

== Youth wings ==
Country	Parent party	Name	Domestic registration status	Member of Pirate Parties International	Member of European Pirate Party	Elected
Austria	Pirate Party of Austria	Junge Pirat*innen	Officially registered	No	No	—N/a
Belarus		Falanster	Active but unregistered	No	No	—N/a
Belgium	Pirate Party Belgium	Jonge Piraten	No official registration required	No	No	—N/a
Czech Republic	Czech Pirate Party	Mladé Pirátstvo	Officially registered	No	No	—N/a
European Union	European Pirates	Young Pirates of Europe	Officially registered	No	Observer Membership with rights of Ordinary Membership	—N/a
Finland	Piraattipuolue	Piraattinuoret	Officially registered	—N/a	—N/a	—N/a
France	Parti pirate	Jeunes Pirates	Officially registered	—N/a	—N/a	—N/a
Germany	Piratenpartei Deutschland	Young Pirates	Officially registered	Observer Member	No	—N/a
Japan	Piratepartei 海賊党	Young Pirates	Officially registered	—N/a	—N/a	—N/a
Luxembourg	Piratepartei Lëtzebuerg	Jonk Piraten	Officially registered	—N/a	—N/a	—N/a
Netherlands	Piratenpartij	Jonge Piraten	Active but unregistered	No	No	—N/a
New Zealand	Pirate Party of New Zealand	Young Pirates New Zealand	Active but unregistered	No	No	—N/a
Norway	Pirate Party of Norway	Unge Pirater	Officially registered	No	No	—N/a
Sweden	Piratpartiet	Young Pirates Sweden	Officially registered	Observer Member	No	—N/a
Iceland	Píratar	Ungir Piratar	Officially registered	—N/a	—N/a	—N/a

== Pirate Parties of micronations and other unrecognised states ==
Country	Name	Domestic registration status	Member of Pirate Parties International	Member of European Pirate Party	Elected	Continent
Verdis	Verdis Pirate Party	Active but unregistered	No	No	No	Europe
