= European Pirate Party =

Pirate European political alliance

- Abbreviation: Pirates
- President: Florian Roussel
- Founded: 21 March 2014; 12 years ago
- Headquarters: 1A Route de Luxembourg, L-8184 Kopstal, Luxembourg
- Ideology: Pirate politics Freedom of information Participatory democracy
- European Parliament group: Greens/EFA
- International affiliation: Pirate Parties International
- Colours: Black
- European Parliament: 1 / 720
- European Commission: 0 / 27
- European Council: 0 / 27
- European Lower Houses: 18 / 6,217
- European Upper Houses: 0 / 1,459

Website
- european-pirateparty.eu

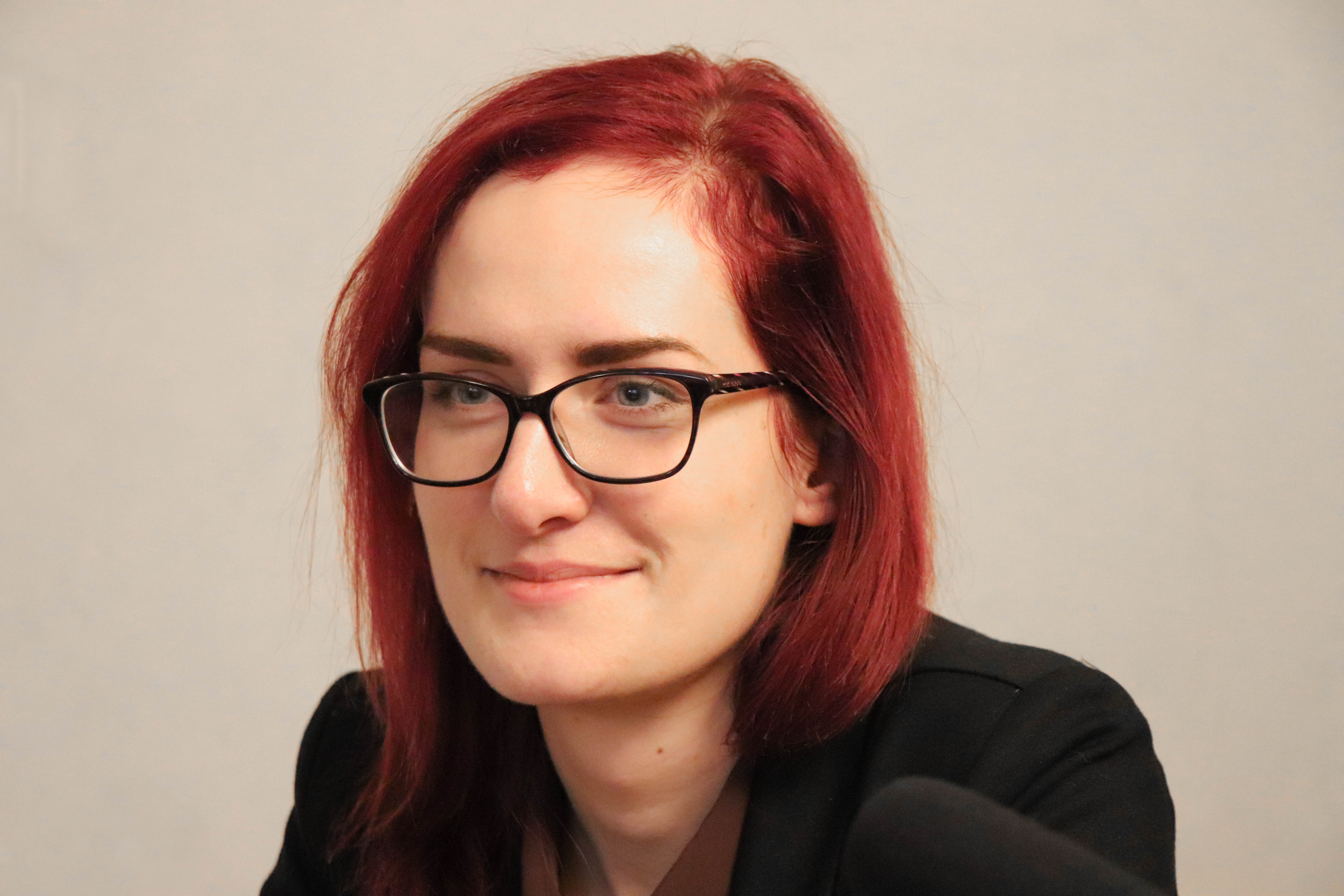
Markéta Gregorová, Former President of the European Pirate Party, in February 2019

The European Pirates (PIRATES) or European Pirate Party (PPEU) is a pirate European political alliance. Despite its organisation and sometimes being referred to as a "European party" or "transnational party", the European Pirate Party does not meet the requirements to register as a European political party.

The European Pirates were founded on 21 March 2014 at the European Parliament in Brussels in the context of a conference on "European Internet Governance and Beyond", and consists of pirate parties of European countries. The parties cooperated to run a joint campaign for the 2014 European Parliament elections.

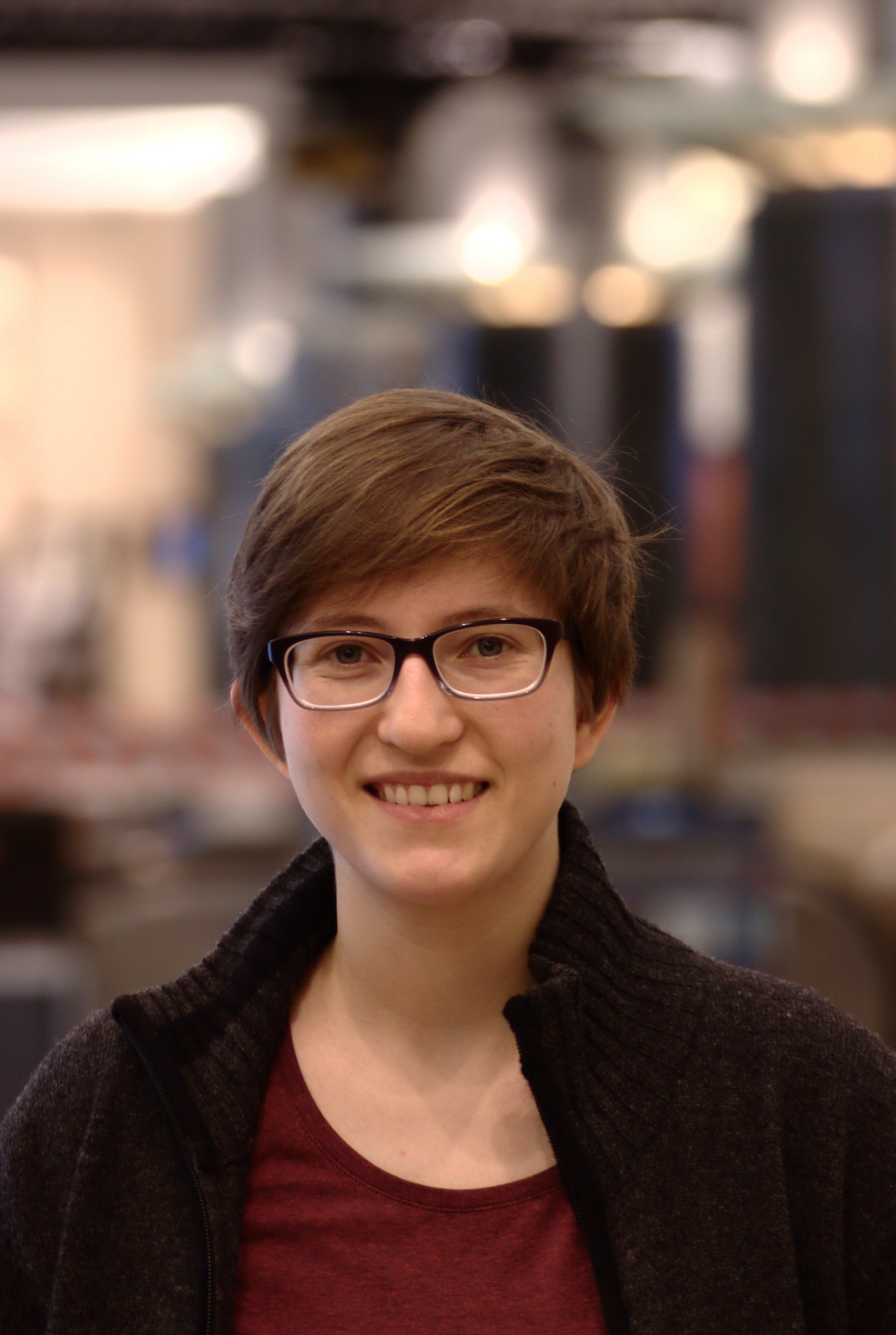
Felix Reda – the Pirate MEP for the 2014 to 2019 term

The founding meeting elected Amelia Andersdotter, Swedish Member of the European Parliament for Piratpartiet, as the first chairperson. The party's members elected to the European Parliament are in The Greens–European Free Alliance.

In November 2020, a new board was elected. Mikuláš Peksa was confirmed as a chairperson, Florie Marie (France) and Katla Hólm Vilbergs Þórhildardóttir (Iceland) were elected as chairperson. Alessandro Ciofini (Italy), Lukáš Doležal, Jan Mareš (both Czech Republic) and Mia Utz, Oliver Herzig (both Germany) were elected as ordinary members of the board.

In the 2024 European Parliament election, it lost three of its four seats. The Pirate Party of Greece unanimously decided, in its 12th Congress held on 1 June 2025, to leave the PPEU and the Pirate Parties International, citing ideological issues, a lack of political added value, and a lack of room for "constructive and productive political discourse".

== Member parties ==
Country	Political party	MEPs	National MPs	
Country	Political party	MEPs	Chamber	Members
Austria	Pirate Party of Austria	0 / 18	Federal Council	0 / 61
Austria	Pirate Party of Austria	0 / 18	National Council	0 / 183
Czech Republic	Czech Pirate Party	1 / 21	Senate	0 / 81
Czech Republic	Czech Pirate Party	1 / 21	Chamber of Deputies	16 / 200
Estonia	Estonian Pirate Party	0 / 7	Riigikogu	0 / 101
Finland	Pirate Party	0 / 13	Parliament of Finland	0 / 200
France	Pirate Party	0 / 74	Senate	0 / 348
France	Pirate Party	0 / 74	National Assembly	0 / 577
Germany	Pirate Party Germany	0 / 96	Bundesrat	0 / 69
Germany	Pirate Party Germany	0 / 96	Bundestag	0 / 735
Iceland	Pirate Party	Not in the EU	Althing	0 / 63
Italy	Italian Pirate Party	0 / 73	Senate	0 / 206
Italy	Italian Pirate Party	0 / 73	Chamber of Deputies	0 / 400
Luxembourg	Pirate Party Luxembourg	0 / 6	Chamber of Deputies	3 / 60
Netherlands	Pirate Party	0 / 29	Senate	0 / 75
Netherlands	Pirate Party	0 / 29	House of Representatives	0 / 150
Norway	Pirate Party of Norway	Not in the EU	Storting	0 / 169
Poland	Polish Pirate Party	0 / 51	Senate	0 / 100
Poland	Polish Pirate Party	0 / 51	Sejm	0 / 460
Slovakia	Pirate Party Slovakia	0 / 14	National Council of Slovakia	0 / 150
Slovenia	Pirate Party of Slovenia	0 / 9	National Council	0 / 40
Slovenia	Pirate Party of Slovenia	0 / 9	National Assembly	0 / 90
Spain	Pirate Confederation	0 / 54	Senate of Spain	0 / 265
Spain	Pirate Confederation	0 / 54	Congress of Deputies	0 / 350
Spain	Pirates of Catalonia	0 / 54	Senate of Spain	0 / 265
Spain	Pirates of Catalonia	0 / 54	Congress of Deputies	0 / 350
Sweden	Pirate Party	0 / 20	Riksdag	0 / 349
Switzerland	Pirate Party Switzerland	Not in the EU	Council of States	0 / 46
Switzerland	Pirate Party Switzerland	Not in the EU	National Council	0 / 200

== Observer parties ==
Country/region	Party
Bavaria	Pirate Party of Bavaria
Belgium	Pirate Party of Belgium
Brandenburg	Pirate Party Brandenburg
Europe	Young Pirates of Europe
Europe	Pirate group in the European Parliament
Serbia	Pirate Party of Serbia
Japan	Pirate Party Japan (日本海賊党)
Potsdam	Pirate Party of Potsdam
World	Pirate Parties International
Hungary	Hungarian Two-Tailed Dog Party
Austria	Minority List of Austria - Danube Federation

== Former members ==
Country/region	Party
Croatia	Pirate Party (Croatia)
Greece	Pirate Party of Greece
Romania	Pirate Party Romania

== See also ==
- Pirate Party
- Pirate Parties International
- Young Pirates of Europe

== Literature ==
- Otjes, S. (2020). All on the same boat? Voting for pirate parties in comparative perspective. Politics, 40(1), 38–53. https://doi.org/10.1177/0263395719833274
