= Piratenpartei =

Piratenpartei is the German expression for Pirate Party and may refer to:

- Piratenpartei Österreichs, Austria
- Piratenpartei Deutschland. Germany
- Piratenpartei Schweiz, Switzerland
