= Pirate Party Australia =

- President: Miles Whiticker
- Secretary: Alex Jago
- Founded: 2008; 18 years ago
- Registered: 17 January 2013; 13 years ago
- Membership (2015): approx. 1,300
- Ideology: Pirate politics E-democracy; Environmentalism; Secularism; Non-interventionism; Welfarism
- National affiliation: Fusion Party
- Colours: Black and blue

Website
- www.pirateparty.org.au

Pirate Party Australia is a political party in Australia that had traditionally represented civil liberty issues, but had also expanded into more traditional areas of policy. It was a Pirate Party which was based on the Pirate Party of Sweden, and continued to develop a comprehensive policy platform since its formation based on the Pirate ethos.

The party voluntarily deregistered on 28 April 2021. It later merged with other parties to become the Fusion Party. Pirate Party Australia's president, Miles Whiticker stood as the Fusion Party candidate during the 2025 Australian Senate election.

== History ==
The Pirate Party was founded in 2008 by Rodney Serkowski with the launch of a website and a wiki, and a request for contributions. In 2009, the first National Council of the Party was elected. Pirate Party Australia was formally registered as a political party by the Australian Electoral Commission on 17 January 2013.

In late 2009, the party announced its intention to contest the 2010 federal election and recruited the 500 members necessary for registration. The party was expected to mainly compete with the Australian Greens and the Reason Party.

Due to registration requirements, the party was not able to contest the 2010 federal election but it registered in January 2013, enabling it to contest the 2013 federal election.

== Platform and policy ==
The Pirate Party's platform was developed collaboratively and democratically, and hosted on a wiki on the Party's website. All policies were required to meet the principles and objectives as set out in the Party's constitution and be supported by a two-thirds majority vote of all full members of the Pirate Party at a relevant meeting. Policies will also only be adopted after the completion of an online seven-day voting period, where all full members may take part.

When founded in 2009, the Pirate Party's platform started off limited to a series of core policies: civil and digital liberties (opposition to internet censorship), government transparency, personal privacy, and copyright and patent reform. By 2013, the platform and policies of the Pirate Party have expanded significantly into a comprehensive policy set that competes with the major parties and larger minor parties in detail and breadth.

Most policy is adopted and debated at a National Congress, which meets annually in July. The meeting is hosted physically, but also simultaneously broadcast live via a web stream with interaction tools, allowing participation for all members and the public regardless of physical proximity from the meeting. Another type of conference called a Policy Meeting can also be hosted specifically for the adoption and debate of policy and platform amendments, which did happen once in April 2013.

In July 2012, the platform saw a very minor revision, introducing protection of quotation rights, unrestricted format shifting, the policy specifically geared towards supporting 3D printing, mandatory privacy breach disclosure, protection for whistleblowers, political donations and transparency treaty-making.

Since 2013, the Party set off to rapidly expand its platform and policy set, expanding into more traditional areas of political discourse such as education, the environment, energy, welfare, taxation and asylum seeker policy.

In April 2013, a Policy Meeting was hosted in order to deliberate on significant amendments to the platform and policy set. For the first time in the Pirate Party's history, the meeting resolved to introduce platform amendments outside traditional Pirate political areas and introduce detailed policy texts to complement the platform, including: clean energy, a moratorium on coal seam gas extraction, taxation reform, welfare reform, drug reform, marriage reform, the introduction of a bill of rights, and improving the electoral process.

The National Congress in July 2013 saw the introduction of further policies, including: civil liberties, cultural participation, education, democratic institution reform, animal welfare, asylum seekers and refugees and foreign policy and treaty-making. The welfare policy was updated to include support for the NDIS and other minor changes.

2014 saw fewer amendments than the overhauls of the previous years, introducing policy amendments relating to constitutional reform, copyright, education, energy, the environment and climate change, privacy law, and tax and welfare.

In February 2015, Pirate Party Australia resigned from Pirate Parties International (PPI) due to serious disagreement with the direction and management of the organisation. In the same month, Pirate Party UK also resigned and in March the Belgian Pirate Party suspended its membership within PPI.

The Pirate Party has a strong focus on evidence-based policy development, listing just under 200 references on their platform as of July 2015.

In 2016, the party announced its support for a universal basic income.

In December 2023, it rejoined the PPI.

=== Euthanasia ===
At the request of Exit International, Pirate Party Australia member David Campbell conducted a series of information sessions as part of Exit International's workshop for seniors who wanted to know how to by-pass the Australian Internet Filter so that they can access information on safe euthanasia techniques.

Pirate Party Australia has adopted Euthanasia rights into their party policy platform.

== Elections ==
=== Australian Capital Territory General Election, 2012 ===
In 2012, members of the Pirate Party's ACT branch ran as independent candidates in the Australian Capital Territory elections. The Pirate Party endorsed three ungrouped candidates in the election, each of whom received 0.4-0.5% of the primary vote.

=== Australian Federal Election, 2013 ===
The Pirate Party was approached by Glenn Druery to be a member of the Minor Party Alliance, but chose to eschew membership of the alliance due to the membership requirement of preferencing far-right parties highly, and instead chose to base preferences upon a democratic vote of its members along policy lines. Democratically deciding their Senate preferences is now standard practice for Pirate Party Australia. It did so in the 2014 Western Australia Senate Rerun.

Pirate Party Australia ran eight candidates for the Senate in the 2013 Federal Election: two candidates each in the states of New South Wales, Queensland, Victoria and Tasmania. The best result was in Tasmania with a 0.6% primary vote. The party was unique in its approach to preference deals with other parties in that they are professing to eschew the secret deals that typify preference negotiations and instead are conducting all such activities openly and transparently and putting all decisions to a membership vote.

=== Griffith by-election, 2014 ===
Melanie Thomas ran for the Pirate Party at the 2014 Griffith by-election and finished fourth out of 11 candidates with a 1.5% primary vote.

=== WA Senate Special Election, 2014 ===
In the 2013 Senate election, Pirate Party Australia did not run candidates in WA. However, due to certain issues with the results of that election, there was a special WA rerun election, where the party did run two candidates. The party preferenced Scott Ludlam of the Australian Greens as their next highest preference.

Pirate Party Australia ran two candidates on the Pirate Party ticket in the special election: Fletcher Boyd and Michelle Allen. Pirate Party Australia received 0.49% of the first preference group ticket votes.

=== Canning by-election, 2015 ===
Michelle Allen contested the 2015 Canning by-election as the Pirate Party candidate and won 775 first preference votes or 0.92% of the total.

=== 2016 federal election ===
In the 2016 federal election Pirate Party Australia fielded two senate candidates in each of New South Wales, Queensland and Victoria, and a candidate for the House of Representatives in the Division of Bennelong.

=== 2019 federal election ===
In the 2019 federal election Pirate Party Australia fielded two senate candidates in each of New South Wales, Queensland, Victoria and Western Australia.

== See also ==
- Censorship in Australia
- Internet in Australia
- List of political parties in Australia
- List of Pirate Parties
- Privacy in Australian law
