= Pirate Party (Tunisia) =

Tunisian political party

Pirate Party حزب القراصنة
- French name: Parti pirate
- Founded: 7 April 2012
- Ideology: Pirate politics Direct democracy Open government Freedom of information Secularism
- International affiliation: Pirate Parties International
- Assembly of the Representatives of the People: 0 / 217

Website
- partipirate.tn

The Pirate Party (Tunisia) (Arabic: حزب القراصنة, romanized: Hizb al-Qarāṣina; French: Parti pirate) is a small political party in Tunisia which was formed on 7 April 2012. It is the second Pirate party in Tunisia after the Tunisian Pirate Party, which gained notoriety during the Tunisian Revolution.

In recent years, it appears to be defunct, with its website being a default Apache server page.

== Party platform ==
On the Pirate Party's official website, it lists its main objectives as:

- preserving the right of every citizen of the absolute freedom of expression, communication, association and assembly
- representation of small investors to protect their companies from traces of intellectual property background
- devoted to a citizen's right to move freely around the world
- direct democracy and the inclusion of digital technology in this area support
- bringing an end to control of the Internet
- dedicated to the neutrality of the Internet
- protecting the freedom of information and independence of investigative journalism
- unconditional and free access to information
- working on the principle of absolute transparency of the government and the public sector
- open government
- promoting alternative systems of copyright and intellectual property
- anti-censorship of all kinds
- defending the rights and freedoms of the individual and the collective, especially with regard to digital freedoms
- use of free software in public institutions in order to adapt to the era of digital technology at the lowest cost and highest performance
- promoting open digital standards
- combating forms of digital monopoly and confront the downsides of proprietary software and the dominance of one party in the market
- elimination of legal obstacles that hinder the right of the media and particularly the media networks, community and non-profit Free
