= PPBS (disambiguation) =

PPBS, or Planning, Programming, and Budgeting System is a management technique introduced in the United States.

PPBS may also stand for:

- Persons Permanently Bound to Security, category of persons in relation to classified information introduced by Canadian Department of National Defence
- Pseudo-profound bullshit
- PPBs, plural for any of PPBs
