= Pirates Center of Belarus =

The Pirates Center of Belarus Пірацкі цэнтр Беларусі
- Founded: September 14, 2012 (site was created)
- Headquarters: Minsk, Belarus
- Ideology: Pirate politics Anti-copyright
- International affiliation: Pirate Parties International

Website
- pirates.by

The Pirates Center of Belarus (Belarusian: Пірацкі цэнтр Беларусі, romanized: Piracki center Bielarusi) is a community of people who support freedom of knowledge, reform of copyright, privacy of personal information and transparent government.

== History ==
The Pirates Center of Belarus was founded in Minsk at the end of 2012. It was the third attempt to create a pirate movement in Belarus.

A website, online social network communities, and contacts with the pirate parties of various countries (such as Russia, Ukraine, Latvia, Poland, Czech Republic, Catalonia, and Spain) were created during the 2nd half of 2012.

From April 19 to April 21, 2013, the Pirates Center of Belarus took part in the general assembly of Pirate Parties International (PPI) and was accepted as an official member of the Pirate Parties International.

== Purposes and Principles ==
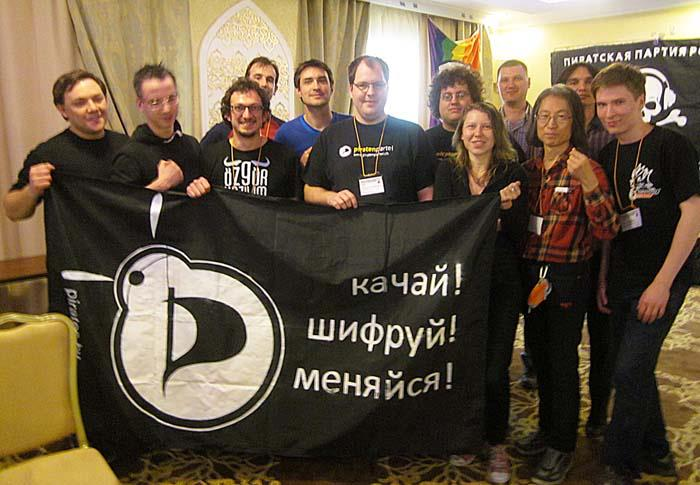
Belarusian Pirates on General Assembly of Pirates Parties International 2013

The main purpose of the Pirates Center of Belarus is the dismantling of the existing copyright laws. It also advocates:

- Alternative licenses and the free choice of the author
- Openness and transparency in government decision-making
- Greater availability of high-speed Internet
- The right to privacy on the internet and in real life
- Free and open knowledge
- Open source software in the social sphere, education and culture

The Pirates Center also claims to uphold the following principles:

- Openness
- Alternativeness
- Initiative
- Action

== Activities ==
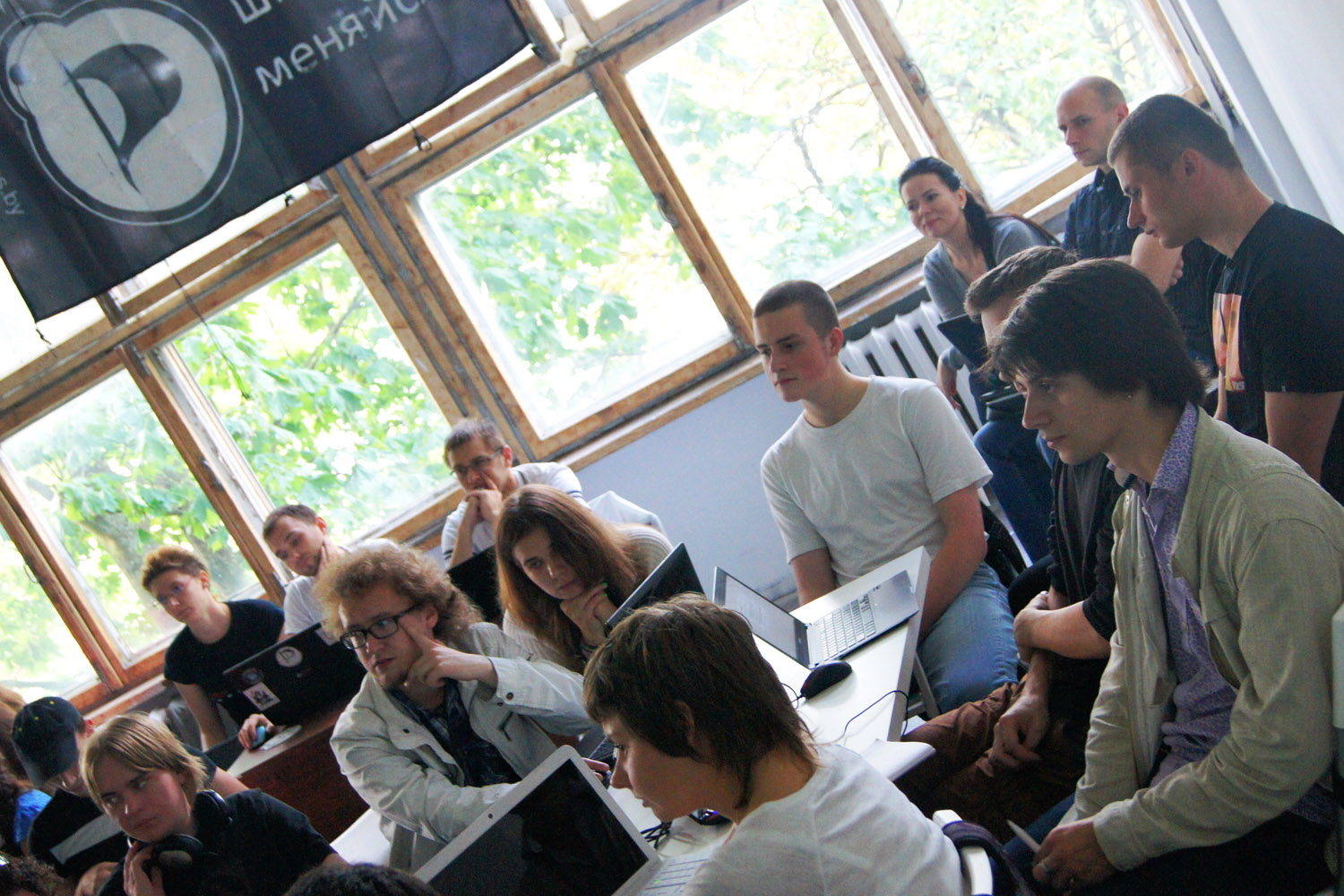
Cryptoparty in Minsk

As of 2013 the main activity of the Pirates Center is education; this includes the organization of public lectures, panel discussions, and film viewings. Other activities include:

- CryptoParties
- Meeting with informal creativists
- Taking part in IT conferences
- Audio sets with pirates of different countries
- Learning copyright laws
- Localization of articles and video subtitles into Russian and Belarusian
- Writing reviews
- Making polls
- Gathering information for libraries and media
