= Denis Simonet =

Swiss politician

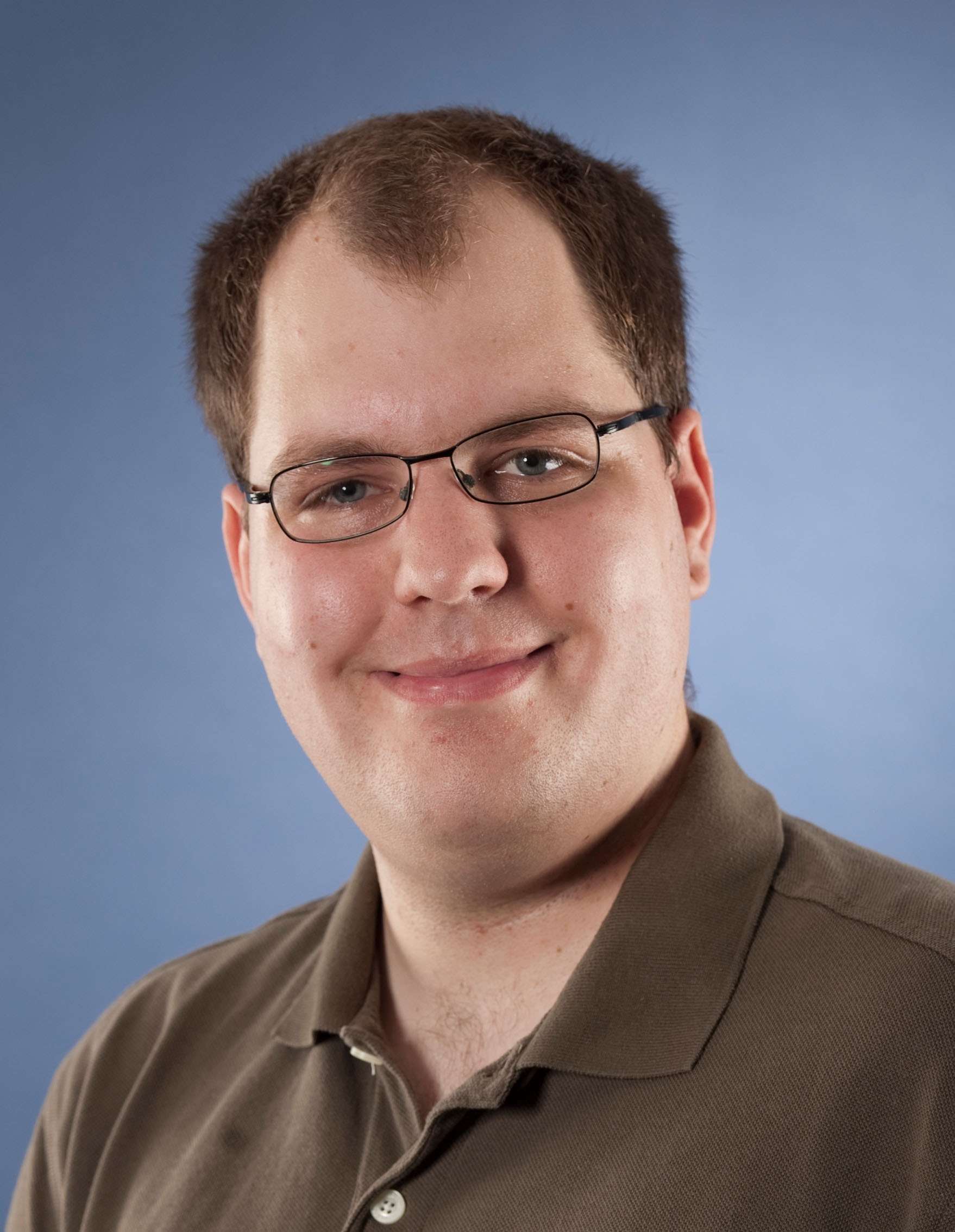
Denis Simonet (2011)

Denis Simonet (born May 21, 1985, Biel/Bienne) is a Swiss politician, and was the first president of the Pirate Party Switzerland (PPS). In April 2012 he was elected as a board member of Pirate Parties International. He also is the chairman of the court of arbitration of PPS and the spokesman of his party.

== Functions at the Pirate Party ==
At the foundation of Pirate Party Switzerland in Zurich, Simonet was elected the first chairman. In March 2012 at the Assembly in Visperterminen he didn't run for this function again. Instead he became the chairman of the new court of arbitration. The board also elected him spokesman. From 15 April 2012 till 13 April 2014 he also was a member of the board of the Pirate Parties International.

== Biography ==
Simonet, a founding member of his party, studied Computer Science at the Swiss Federal Institute of Technology Zurich and switched to the Bern University of Applied Sciences. He is also a founding member of the Swiss Privacy Foundation. One of his hobbies is playing the piano. He released his two compositions on last.fm and composed the jingle for the independent podcast parrot.fm. His composition «Move on» was rearranged and produced by MG Rizzello, the song is available for free on Bandcamp. He also acts as a reporter for parrot.fm and he is a member of the Swiss association of specialized journalists.

== Politics ==
Simonet participated in the cantonal elections of Bern 2010 on first position on the list "PIRATEN" in district Biel-Seeland and got 726 votes, which wasn't enough to gain a seat. At those elections Pirate Party Switzerland got 0.7% of all votes. At the national elections 2011 he was on list place 3 and got 4904 votes. Again Pirate Party Switzerland got 0.7% of all votes in the canton of Bern. Simonet owns a lobbyist passport for the federal parliament building which he got from Lukas Reimann, a national council of the political party "SVP".

From December 13, 2010 to December 24, 2010 Simonet wrote about digital policy for the well known newspaper Neue Zürcher Zeitung and for the IT Magazine Netzwoche he was interviewed as an expert on surveillance and privacy. In his own blog he often writes about digital policy, some posts were already overtaken by the students portal students.ch and the newspaper Tages-Anzeiger. He is a member of the committee for more transparency in politics and fought against the reintroduction of fixed book prizes as a member of the committee against expensive books.

Because of his nearness to music Simonet advocates a liberal copyright law which allows the free exchange of culture. Therefore, the Swiss rapper Gimma attacked him in an open letter. Simonet answered in a blog post with the title «Das Internet ist kein Nazi-Regime» (the internet is not a Nazi regime).

== Others ==
Simonet is the contact person of the domain name wikileaks.ch on which the wikileaks website has been transferred on December 3, 2010. The domain and redirection have been set up by Pirate Party Switzerland due to a board decision on June 8, 2010. At the founding assembly of Pirate Parties International he represented PPS as a delegate, together with Pascal Gloor.
