= Piratenpartij =

Piratenpartij may refer to:

- Pirate Party (Belgium)
- Pirate Party (Netherlands)
