= Pirate Party of New Zealand =

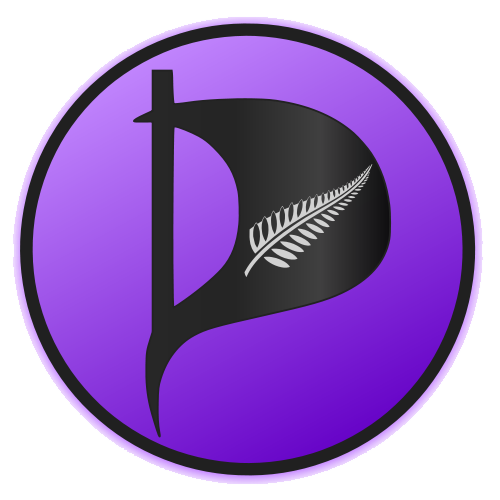
- President: Andrew Reitemeyer
- Secretary: Ben Vidulich
- Founded: 2009
- Ideology: Pirate politics IP reform Freedom of information Open government Network neutrality
- International affiliation: Pirate Parties International

Website
- pirateparty.org.nz

The Pirate Party of New Zealand (PPNZ) was an unregistered political party in New Zealand. The party was based on the Swedish Pirate Party and focused on issues of copyright and patent reform and internet privacy. It contested elections in 2011. It was a member of Pirate Parties International.

== History ==
=== Activity in 2011 ===
Hussain al-Saady contested the March 2011 Botany by-election for the party, winning 32 votes (0.2% of the total).

In June 2011, the party was conditionally awarded $20,000 of broadcasting funding for the 2011 election. In September 2011 the Electoral Commission registered the party's logo.

On 27 August 2011, the party took part in a nationwide protest against the Infringing File Sharing Amendment Act: several hundred people around New Zealand drew media attention to the revised law.

The Pirate Party was a non-registered party in the 2011 General Election, but contested the Hamilton East and Wellington Central electorates. The party won 137 votes in Hamilton East, and 277 in Wellington Central.

=== Activity after 2011 ===
PPNZ did not stand any candidates at the 2014 election. PPNZ sought the members required for registration to run in the 2017 election, but ultimately did not run any candidates.

== See also ==
- Internet Party (New Zealand)
