= Florian Hufsky =

Austrian politician (1986–2009)

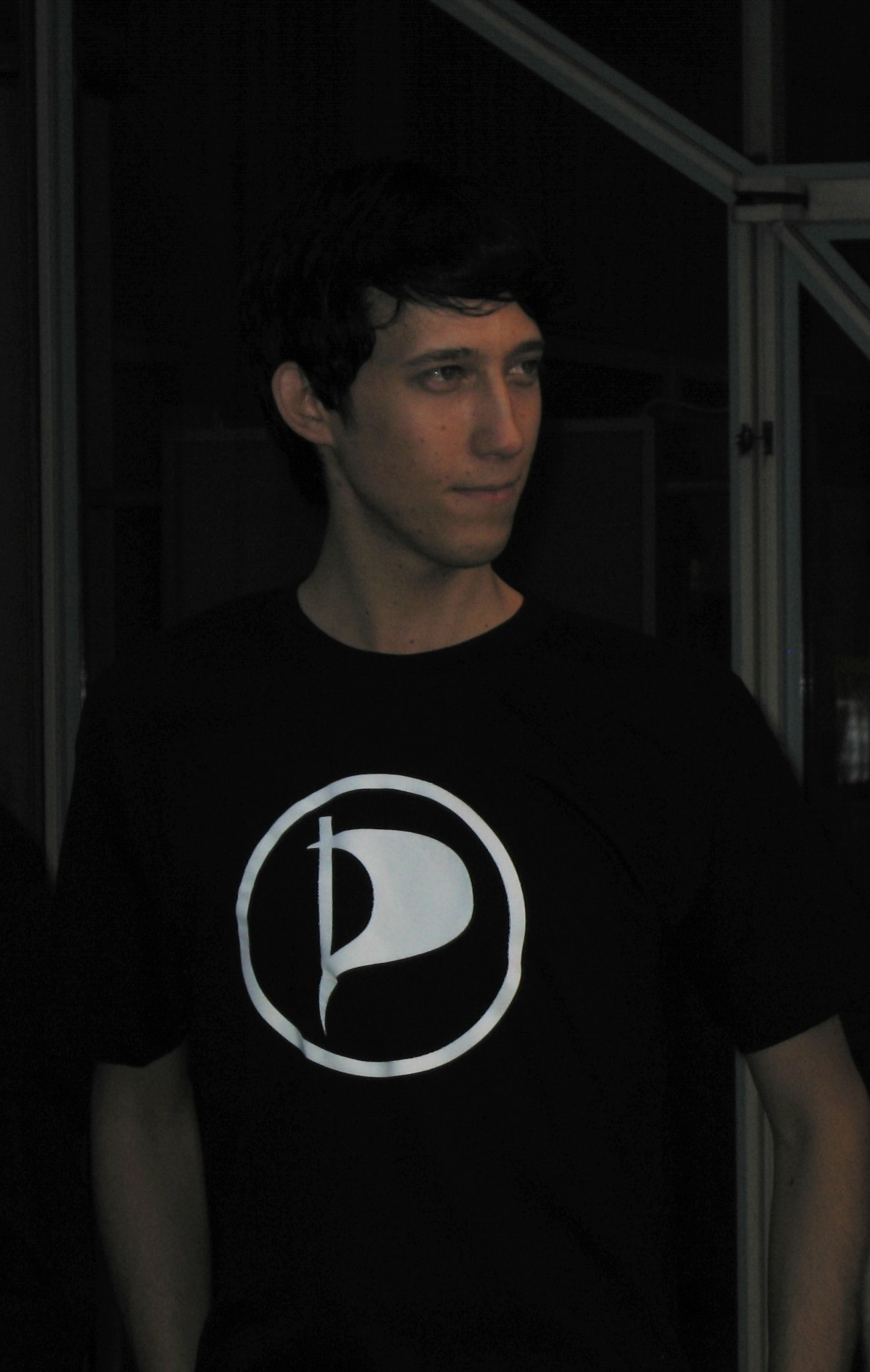
- Hufsky in 2007
- Born: November 13, 1986; Villach, Austria
- Died: December 16, 2009 (aged 23); Vienna, Austria
- Occupations: New media artist, political activist, board member of Pirate Party of Austria, student, game designer

Florian Hufsky (November 13, 1986 – December 16, 2009) was an Austrian new media artist, computer hacker, political activist, founder and former board member of the Pirate Party of Austria. He studied graphic design at the University of Applied Arts Vienna, but died by suicide before he could finish his studies.

He created the Super Mario derivative Super Mario War, was a member of the programming and design group "72dpiarmy" and of Vienna's hackerspace Metalab. In cooperation with Michael Zeltner he enhanced the open source laser graffiti software of the Graffiti Research Lab (GRL) in New York, and participated at the Ars Electronica Festival in Linz as well as at the 2007 DigiTaika in Helsinki.

Hufsky organized the first International Pirate Party Conference. At the PPI general assembly 2011 Rickard Falkvinge honoured Hufsky's involvement in helping to start the international movement by dedicating his closing keynote to him.
