= Pirate Party of Serbia =

Pirate Party of Serbia Пиратска партија Србије Piratska partija Srbije
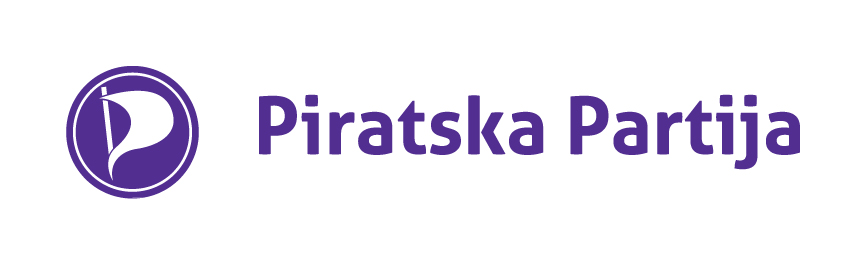
- Leader: Dalibor Marinović
- Founded: 8 January 2022
- Headquarters: Belgrade
- Membership (2010): 1,600
- Ideology: Pirate politics Liberalism; E-democracy; Direct democracy
- Political position: Center
- International affiliation: Pirate Parties International
- Colours: Purple

Website
- pirati.org.rs

The Pirate Movement (Serbian: Удружење Пирати) is an unregistered political party in Serbia. It strived to ban copyright based systems, reform intellectual property law, protect freedom of speech, preserve and promote net neutrality and privacy, introduce liquid democracy in Serbia and defend personal privacy as basis for the sovereignty of the citizen. On January 22, 2022, the party was accepted as an observer member of the European Pirate Party.

== History ==
The Pirate Party of Serbia was founded on 2 February 2008 as a political faction in Serbia based on the model of the Swedish Pirate Party. It is also one of the 22 founding members of Pirate Parties International.

=== Pirate Movement ===
Pirate Movement of Serbia logo

The Pirate Movement (Serbian: Piratski Pokret) is non-governmental organization (NGO) registered on 21 September 2012, founded by majority group of Pirate Party 'Core Team' members.

Movement formation followed disagreement over support of the 2012 Belgrade Pride parade. Pirate Party leader Aleksandar Blagojević promoted support for the Pride Parade in the name of Pirate party, without consulting members, resulting in 6 out of 8, forum and Core team members voting against explicit support of Pride parade. Blagojević argued that the vote to not support the parade ran contrary to the party principles, which included human rights (and including by he's own opinion same-sex marriages). Opinions escalated in sites takeovers, locking mailing lists and existence of 2 separate sites and web forums. Blagojević blocked access to the site and mailing list, informally expelling the majority of the Core Team members, referring to Pirate Party members as (in he's opinion): "conservative right-wingers" and "intolerant of minorities". Pirate movement showed their own explanation of events, regarding Blagojević for despotism, lies, threats and blocking and corrupting of the decision process.
