= Italian Pirate Party =

Italian political party

Italian Pirate Party Partito Pirata Italiano
- Secretary: Maria Rosaria lo Muzio
- Treasurer: Emmanuele Somma
- Guarantor: Aldo A. Pazzaglia
- Founded: 16 September 2006
- Newspaper: Piratpartiet Diritti Digitali
- Ideology: Pirate politics Freedom of information Anti-fascism; Republicanism
- National affiliation: The Other Europe (2014)
- International affiliation: Pirate Parties International
- European political alliance: European Pirate Party
- Colours: Orange, white and black
- Slogan: Democrazia – Trasparenza – Diritti digitali

Website
- www.partito-pirata.it

The Italian Pirate Party (Italian: Partito Pirata Italiano, PPIT) is a political party in Italy, founded on 16 September 2006, modelled on the Pirate Party of Sweden, founded earlier that year. It supports reform of copyright and patent law, privacy and freedom of expression.

The party was a founding member of Pirate Parties International and of European Pirate Party.

In December 2007 the Pirate Party published its first number of the newspaper "PiratPartiet Diritti digitali" under Creative Commons license.

== History ==
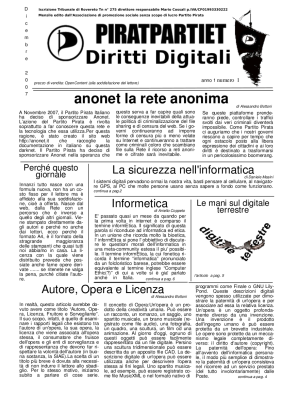
"Diritti Digitali" (Creative Commons license)

In the 2009 EP elections the Party candidated its secretary, Alessandro Bottoni, as an independent in the Left and Freedom list in the Northern-Oriental Italy circoscription, gaining only 820 preferences and any seat in the EP parliament.

In 2011 Marco Manuel Marsili founded a political party named "Pirate Party" with Jolly Roger on an orange background as symbol. It initially included the signet of the Pirate Party International. It caused a legal dispute, followed by an order from the court of Milan on 30 March 2012, which obliged the Marsili's party not to use the Pirate Party symbols in order to protect the name and the symbol of the Italian Pirate Party. The court sentenced for a fine for every violation and condemned Manuel Marco Marsili to pay the litigation costs.

In December 2011 the Party changed its statute and is the first organization to replace its board by a permanent virtual assembly using the LiquidFeedback platform.

In the 2013 regional elections in Lazio the Party candidated Arturo Di Corinto as independent in Left Ecology Freedom, but he was not elected. The party was also interested to run in the 2013 Trentino-Alto Adige/Südtirol elections but in the end he did not participate.

In the local elections in Rome, the Party initially was intended to present its own candidate for mayor, Josef Yemane Tewelde named "Jojo", an Eritrean-Italian boy, technically not electable because he did not have the Italian citizenship. Then, it joined the list "Repubblica Romana" with Sandro Medici candidate for mayor, collecting 720 votes (0.07%) and gaining no seat. Initially there was the intention to run with a candidate for president in the Friuli-Venezia Giulia regional elections, but it finally did not take part to those elections.

At the end of the XVI Italian Republic Legislature, thanks to the success of the Pirate Party Germany, the party received some join requests from people coming from other parties: Francesco Barbato (ex-IdV) wanted to use LiquidFeedback in the Parliament, by recruiting two pirates in his staff, but he founded his own movement "I Cittadini" (The Citizens), after his request has been rejected. Even Domenico Scilipoti (ex-People and Territory, now FI) tried to join the Pirate movement but he was not accepted, so he decided to be elected again in Berlusconi's party The People of Freedom.

On 23 and 24 March 2013 there was the first Occasional Assembly (Assemblea Occasionale, AO), the congress of the Pirate Party, in Milan.

On 25 January 2014, the second Occasional Assembly took part in Florence, where mutek, alias Luca Cappelletti, has been elected as legal representative of the Party.

On 9 April 2014, the Party joined Tsipras' list (The Other Europe) for the European Parliament election. In the 2014 local elections in Ferrara the Party wanted to join the coalition "Project for Ferrara" (Progetto per Ferrara) with former M5S member Valentino Tavolazzi's "Democracy on the move" (Democrazia in Movimento). but the coalition will not take part to elections. The party ran for local elections in Pioltello, under the name of "Pioltello Pirata", candidating Cosimo Antonio Gervasi as mayor, but the list gained 163 preferences (1.04%), not gaining any seat in the local council.

In 2019, the Pirate Party ran with its list in the European Parliament election, obtaining 0.23% of the votes.

== Electoral results ==
=== European Parliament ===
Election	Leader	Votes	%	Seats	+/–	EP Group
2019	Luigi Di Liberto	60,809	0.23	0 / 76	New	–
