= Pirate Party Turkey =

Pirate Party Turkey Korsan Parti Türkiye
- Headquarters: Istanbul
- Youth wing: Korsan Ocakları
- Ideology: Pirate politics Neo-Piratism; Anti-copyright; Big tent Libertarianism; Factions: Green politics Anarchism
- Political position: Syncretic
- International affiliation: Pirate Parties International; International Logic Party; Pirate Party Middle East
- Colours: Black/White

Party flag

The Pirate Party Turkey (Turkish: Korsan Parti Türkiye) is a political organization in Turkey based on the model of the Swedish Pirate Party. It was firstly founded by Serdar Kuzuloğlu and İsmail Hakkı Polat on August 26, 2009. After getting dissolved in 2010 due to infighting and disagreements, it got refound in 2013 by Serhat Koç, Barış Büyükakyol and Şevket Uyanık. The organization is inactive since 2015 and a reorganization attempt in 2017 got unsuccessful. The organization got a third refoundation on January 21, 2021, which is still in process of reorganizing the old supporters while trying to appeal to the new generation.

== History ==
=== First generation (2009–2010) ===
Serdar Kuzuloğlu started the Pirate Party of Turkey movement on August 26, 2009. Over the call of Kuzuloğlu, İsmail H. Polat who was busy on a documentary about Pirate Party of Sweden joined the foundation process. After the positive feedback over the open call of the party, the two initiated the organizing process and contacted Pirate Party of Sweden for suggestions. After hearing their experience and gathering their suggestions, the party tried to synthesize the pirate ideology to local culture and finally started the movement on the net. The website and pages in various social media platforms are opened to appeal to the biggest audience possible. In addition to that, a Pirate Bulletin is opened over Google Groups. At the end of 2009, nearly 3.000 people interacted with Pirate Party of Turkey.

After the infighting and overall difficulty of Turkish political party laws, the movement withered away by time.

=== Second generation (2010–2017) ===
Serhat Koç withdrew people who were members of the group by interacting with the Google group of the Pirate Party, which lost its activity after 2010. Following Serhat's 2-year organizing process within the group, the party was introduced to the public under the leadership of Serhat Koç, Şevket Uyanık and Barış Büyükakyol in 2013, and the first open meeting was held on Saturday, on August 10, 2013, at 14:00 for the establishment of the party. As a result of the failure of the establishment of the party like the past Pirate Party period, the existence of the organization as an association and under the name of Pirate Party Movement was accepted by an overwhelming majority. The movement took part in the Open Coalition that prepared the Deputy Integrity Pledge signed by Kemal Kılıçdaroğlu in 2015. During this period, it became clear that the Pirate Party would not compete in the current politics aimed at power, or would not go the traditional right-left distinction, but would direct the politics from outside in line with its principles, adopting a syncretic line when it comes to policies.

The movement was divided into two due to corruption incidents as of 2016, and many people, including Serhat Koç left the organization. Even though several people like Mehmet Şafak Sarı attempted to revive the divided movement during this period, no success was achieved.

=== Third generation (2021–present) ===
The reorganization of the movement came to the fore with the opening of a new Pirate Party Twitter account and website in early 2021. Several netizens belonging to Gen Z contacted some former Pirate Party founders and started a mass refoundation campaign of Pirate Party in Turkey. By participation of various people from different backgrounds, A Refoundation Committee responsible for administration of the party to operate until a proper constitution is formed. The organization is still in process of reorganizing the Pirate Party in Turkey and getting interest of the new generation by following the agenda and participating in youth movements.

== Party platform ==
=== Social policies ===
==== Civil rights and liberties ====
Pirate Party of Turkey (PPTR) favors the civil right to information privacy and reforms of copyright, education, computer science and genetic patents as well as promotion of copyright and usage/development of free software. PPTR promotes in particular an enhanced transparency of government. PPTR is a community existed to defend the internet as a realm unrestricted and free of phishing. For global, free and open internet, The PPTR will keep on organizing and supporting protests against the mechanisms of censor, and mechanisms that help to control and trace online privacy.

==== Civil disobedience ====
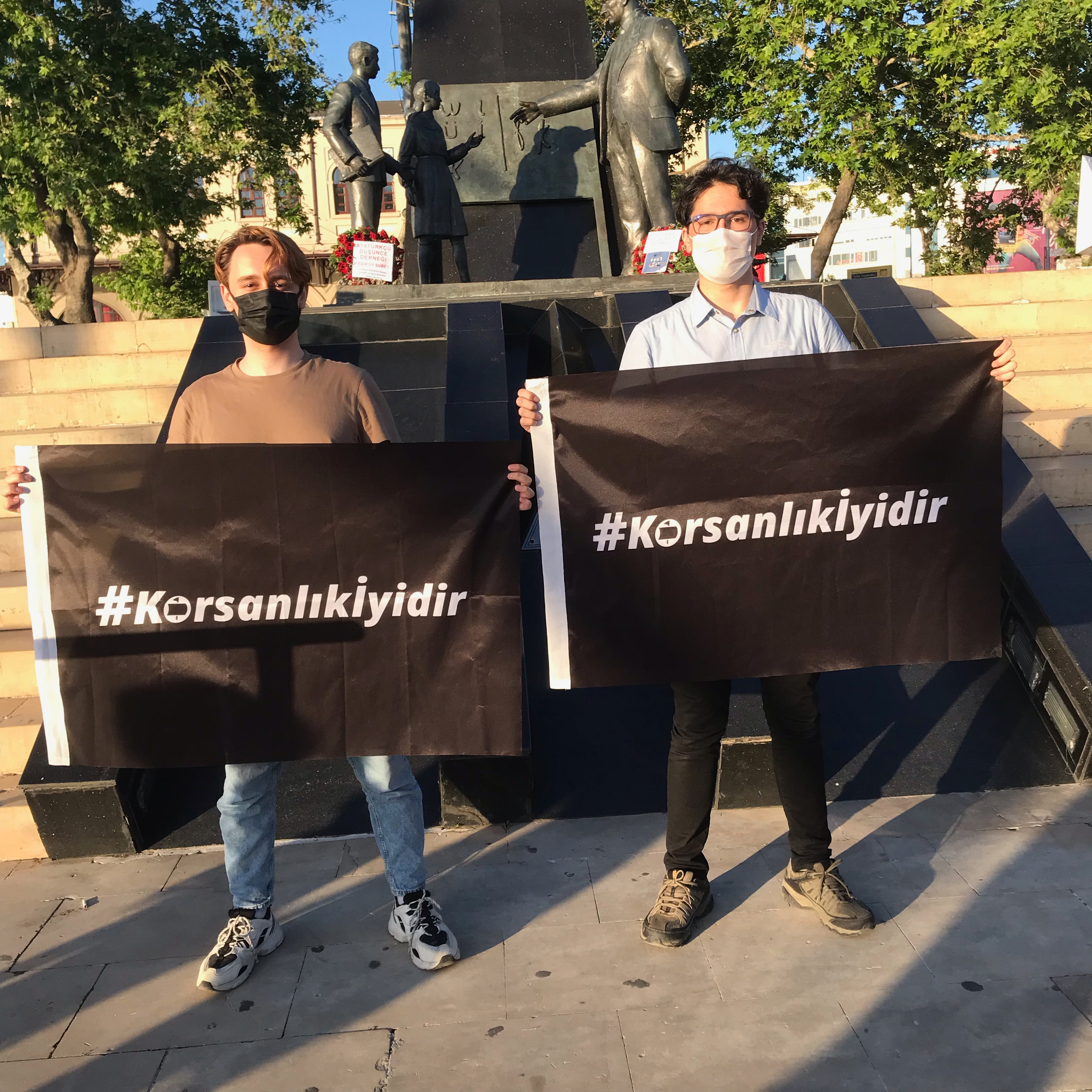
Pirate Party Turkey members in Kadıköy participating in #HayatEveSığmıyor protests against the lockdown, which got organized on Twitter.

According to PPTR, civil disobedience movements located on the Internet, tries to attract attention to the concerns and priorities about fundamental rights and freedoms. The PPTR supports freedom of expression with regard to basic ideas, arguments and intellectual viewpoints motivated by the concept of freedom of information. PPTR is impartial, independent and does not include any form of hierarchy and existed through the motive of “defending freedoms”.

==== Open Access ====
The party opposes the dismantlement of civil rights especially on the Internet and other means of communication. The Party also opposes Turkey's view on Internet censorship and various measures of surveillance of citizens. The PPTR supports freedom of expression on Internet.

==== Infrastructure Monopoly ====
The PPTR's support for freedom of expression with regard to basic ideas, arguments and intellectual viewpoints is motivated by the concept of freedom of information. PPTR is impartial, independent and does not include any form of hierarchy and existed through the motive of “defending freedoms”. The censorship by government agencies will be rejected.

==== Decentralization ====
The party supports decentralised systems in both governmental and corporate levels for sustaining direct democracy.

=== Economic policies ===
Brochure of the Turkish Pirate Party. Top text reads «YOU ARE NEEDED FOR THE PIRATE PARTY!». Bottom text reads «Your ideas, your skill[s], your potential, your intelligence, your passion will strengthen the Pirate Party, free ideas will repeat!». Note that the Uncle Sam (from the iconic «I WANT YOU TO JOIN THE ARMY» poster) being depicted as a pirate.

==== Free and fast Internet ====
PPTR sees access to the Internet as a human right from which everyone should benefit, so it supports mass conversion to Fiber Internet technology in the entire nation in 10 years by funding ISP companies and making it accessible and free for everyone.

==== Cryptocurrencies ====
The party supports integration of Cryptocurrencies by removing high taxes on them and funding projects based on Blockchain technology.

==== Open source ====
PPTR urges the need of switching to open source software and operating systems in all public infrastructure, and funding open source entrepreneurships to spread them.

==== Cooperativism ====
The party promises to make credit to the cooperatives of all sectors to spread cooperativist business model.

==== Copyright and patent ====
The party supports copyright and patent reform to reduce their deadlines in order to boost accessibility.
