= PPB =

PPB can stand for:

- Production possibility boundary , a concept in economics
- Parts per billion, describing small values of miscellaneous dimensionless quantities
- Portland Police Bureau, in Portland, Oregon, U.S.
- Partido Progressista Brasileiro, former name of Progressive Party of Brazil
- Pleuropulmonary blastoma, a type of lung cancer
- PPB Group, a Malaysian company

== See also ==
- Point Pleasant Beach, New Jersey
- List of Pirate Parties
