= Pirate Party (Norway) =

Piratpartiet Piratpartiet
- Abbreviation: PIR
- Leader: Svein Mork Dahl
- Founded: 16 December 2012
- Headquarters: Oslo
- Youth wing: Unge Pirater
- Membership (2017): 107
- Ideology: Pirate politics
- International affiliation: Pirate Parties International
- European political alliance: European Pirate Party
- Colors: Black and orange
- Storting: 0 / 169
- County councils: 0 / 777
- Municipal councils: 0 / 10,620
- Sámi Parliament: 0 / 39

Website
- https://piratpartiet.no

The Pirate Party (Norwegian: Piratpartiet) is a Norwegian political party which was founded in 2012. Its basic principles are "full transparency in state management, privacy on the internet, as well as better use of IT and technology to make a better democracy". On 17 December 2012 they announced that they had collected the 5,000 signatures required by law to register a political party and take part in the 2013 Norwegian parliamentary election. The party is a part of the Pirate Parties International.

== History ==
=== Founding ===
In June 2012, the party issued invitations to a kickoff meeting to be held in Trondheim on the 16th, with the intention of agreeing on a strategy to obtain the 5,000 signatures required by law to register a political party. By 16 December, they had received sufficient signatures and were legally recognised.

=== Name ===
On 11 March 2023, the party congress decided to change the party's name to Innovasjon- og teknologipartiet (The Innovation and Technology party).

In October 2024, the party changed its name back to the Pirate Party, which can be observed through updates on their media pages.

== Party Leaders ==
Sources:

- Svein Mork Dahl (2019–present)
- Thomas Gramstad (2017–2019)
- Tale Haukbjørk Østrådal (2015–2017)
- Øystein Bruås Jakobsen (2013–2015)
- Geir Aaslid (2012–2013)

== Parliamentary Election results ==
Election year	# of overall votes	% of overall vote	# of overall seats won
2013	9,869	0.3 (#12)	0 / 169
2017	3,347	0.1 (#15)	0 / 169
2021	2,308	0.1 (#20)	0 / 169
