= Pirate Party (France) =

Pirate Party Parti pirate (PP)
- National Secretaries: Secrétariat
- Treasurers: Conseil de Trésorie et de Comptabilité (CTC)
- Co-Internal Life Delegates: Conseil de Vie Interne (CVI)
- Co-Speakers: Porte-paroles
- Founded: 21 June 2006
- Headquarters: 21 Place de la République; 75003 Paris
- Youth wing: Parti pirate Jeunes (PPJ)
- Membership (2021): 456
- Ideology: Pirate politics E-democracy; Intellectual property reform Protection of privacy Environmentalism; Civil libertarianism
- Political position: Left-wing
- International affiliation: Pirate Parties International (2010–2024)
- European political alliance: European Pirate Party
- Colours: Black, White

Website
- partipirate.org

The Pirate Party (French: Parti pirate, PP) is a political party in France based on the model of the Swedish Pirate Party.

The party proposes the reform of the copyright law, free access to scientific knowledge, as well as protection of individual freedom. Like other pirate parties in Europe, it is affiliated to European Pirate Party (PPEU). The youth organisation is called Parti Pirates Jeunes (PPJ; Pirate Party Youth) respectively Les Jeunes du Parti pirate (The Youth of Pirate Party).

== History ==
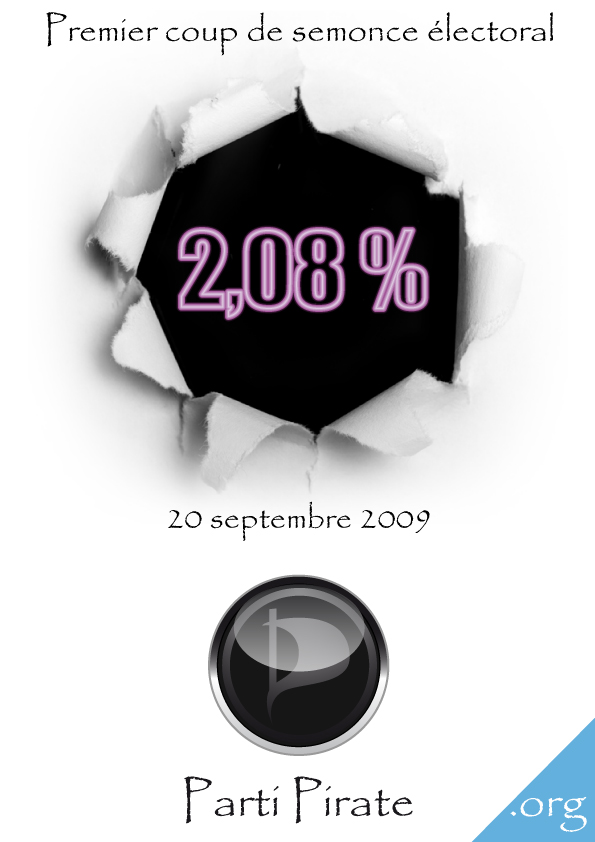
"First electoral warning shot 2.08%." (election poster)

The French Pirate party movement was founded on 21 June 2006, relating to the vote of the French Law on Copyright and Related Rights in the Information Society better known as DADVSI. Due to dissension a new section of the Pirate Party emerged in 2007, called Parti pirate français Canal historique (PPFCH). On 4 April 2009, the foundation of the Pirate Party as an organisation was published in the Journal officiel de la République française (page 1663, no. 1795). PP and PPFCH had similar aims and reunited in summer of 2009. Already during the debate on the HADOPI law a further pirate party named Parti pirate français (PPF) appeared, founded by Rémy Cérésiani. The PPF, which had an identical logo combined with a similar name to the PP was finally disbanded in September 2009.

The PP took part in the 10th Yvelines department election on 20 September 2009, and received 472 votes in the first round (turnout: 22.76%), which was 2.08%. There was no record of voting in the second round (turnout: 25.99%), which was won by the conservative UMP candidate.

The Pirate Party has continued to run in French elections as a minor party. In the 2022 French legislative elections, the party received 19,389 votes, 0.09% of the ballots cast in that election.

== Legislative election 2012 ==
The Pirate Party, participated in the 2012 legislative election presenting 101 candidates. Their aim was 50 candidates to receive over 1% to allow them to receive public funding, they only received 24 candidates over 1%. They achieved an average of 0.85% across the districts they stood in. Their best result in metropolitan France was the district of Haut-Rhin with 2.41% but their overall best showing was in the 7th district of oversea French Nationals where they achieved 2.85%.

== Election results ==
=== European Parliament ===
Election	Leader	Votes	%	Seats	+/−	EP Group
2014	Unclear	39,338	0.21 (#19)	0 / 79	New	−
2019	Florie Marie	30,105	0.13 (#18)	0 / 79	0	−
2024	Caroline Zorn	28,745	0.12 (#19)	0 / 81	0	−
