= Pirate Party of Ukraine =

Pirate Party of Ukraine Піратська Партія України
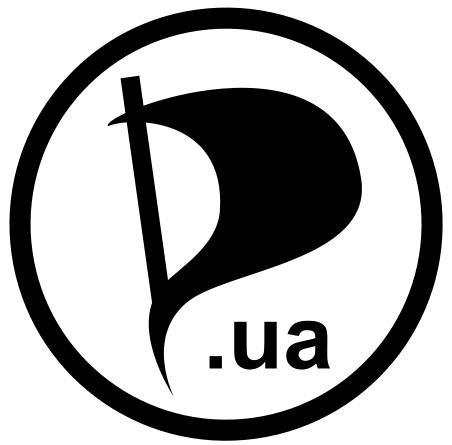
- President: Sergey Yarygin
- Founded: 27 September 2011
- Ideology: Pirate politics Civil rights Patent reform
- International affiliation: Pirate Parties International

Website
- pp-ua.org

The Pirate Party of Ukraine (Ukrainian: Піратська Партія України, romanized: Piratska Partiia Ukrainy) is a political party in Ukraine. Based on the model of the Swedish Pirate Party, it supports reform of copyright law, the abolition of patents, and respect for privacy. The party was not a founding member of Pirate Parties International but it joined them in April 2013. As of August 2013 the party is not officially registered as such by the Ukrainian Ministry of Justice.

In the 2012 parliamentary election the party supported independent candidate Tetiana Montian in single-member district number 212 (first-past-the-post wins a parliament seat) located in Kyiv; she ended up fifth in this district with 9% of the votes.

The party did not participate in the 2014 Ukrainian parliamentary election.

In the 2019 Ukrainian parliamentary election the party had 1 candidates in constituency 95 located in Irpin, but he got only 0.15% of the votes (133 votes).
