= Tunisian Pirate Party =

Tunisian political party

Tunisian Pirate Party حزب القراصنة التونسي
- French name: Parti pirate tunisien
- Founded: 27 September 2010
- Legalized: 12 March 2012
- Ideology: Pirate politics
- Assembly of the Representatives of the People: 0 / 217

Website
- https://partipirate-tunisie.org/

The Tunisian Pirate Party (Arabic: حزب القراصنة التونسي Hizb al-Qarāṣina at-Tūnsī; French: Parti pirate tunisien) is a small political party in Tunisia. It was formed in 2010 and legalised on 12 March 2012, becoming one of the first outgrowths of the Pirate Party movement in both the Arab World and Africa.

The party achieved notoriety during the Tunisian revolution, as party members declared their intention to break a media blackout on the social unrest taking place across the country. Members distributed censorship circumvention software, and assisted in documenting human rights abuses during the riots in the cities of Sidi Bouzid, Siliana, and Thala.

After the revolution, a Pirate Party member who had been detained during the unrest, Slim Amamou, was briefly selected as Secretary of State for Sport and Youth in the new government. He later resigned in protest of repressive measures by the interim government, such as the transitional government's censorship of several websites at the request of the army.

In recent years, the party appears to be defunct, with its URL taken over by a betting site.
