= Pirate Party of Brazil =

Political party in Brazil

Pirate Party Partido Pirata
- Secretary: Chico Prates; Givaldo Corcino
- Founded: 28 July 2012
- Headquarters: Brasília
- Think tank: Aaron Swartz Institute
- Ideology: Pirate politics IP reform Network neutrality Secularism
- Political position: Syncretic
- International affiliation: Pirate Parties International
- Colours: Black, white, purple

Website
- partidopirata.org

The Pirate Party (Portuguese: Partido Pirata, PIRATAS), formerly called the Pirate Party of Brazil (Portuguese: Partido Pirata do Brasil) is a political organization in Brazil. Based on the model of the Swedish Pirate Party, it supports reformation of copyright law, freedom of information, and privacy. The party was a founding member of Pirate Parties International.

The party has not yet been registered by the Superior Electoral Court.

== History ==
=== Background ===
The Pirate Party initially appeared in 2007.

The Pirate Party has met at various events, such as the Campus Party Brasil, in São Paulo, and the Circo Digital, in Rio de Janeiro. The first official meeting of the party was held on March 28 and 29, 2009. The event, called the "First Pirate Insurgency", brought together some of its main activists to define the Pirate Party's guidelines for action in Brazil.

=== Foundation ===
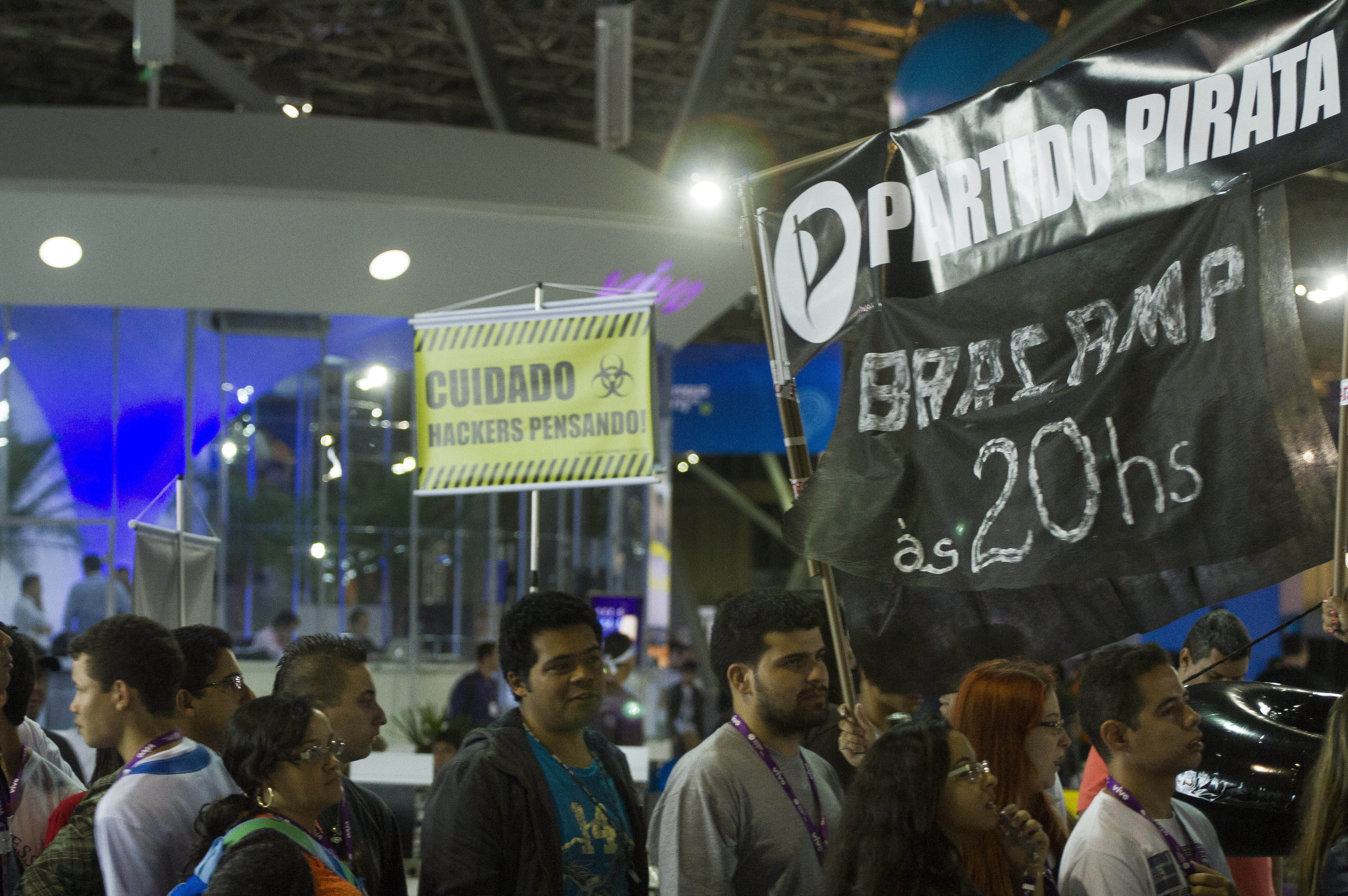
The Pirate Part on Campus Party Brasil, in 2013

The official creation of the party took place on July 27 and 28, 2012, at its National Foundation Convention in Recife. Roughly 130 activists from 15 states met to discuss the foundation of the party, and on July 28 they signed the founding documents.

The party's first national board, elected at the event, was composed of three general secretaries: Alexsandro Albuquerque, from Pernambuco, as general secretary; Kristian Pasini, from Bahia, as second secretary, and Henrique Peer, from São Paulo, as third secretary.

On 2 September 2013, the statute and party programme of the Pirate Party of Brazil were published in the Official Journal of the Union.

On 10 December 2013, the party completed another stage of its foundation, obtaining official registration in notary and its own CNPJ.

The first National Assembly of the party took place between 23 and 25 May 2014 at the Impact Hub Curitiba, when its statute, political programme, economic positioning were discurssed, and signatures for the officialisation of the party were collected. About 90 members attended the event in-person while others attended via the Internet.

== Ideology ==
The party's focus is on the defense of human rights, freedom of speech, privacy and knowledge sharing, which are threatened by attempts to control the network in order to ban file sharing. It also advocates digital inclusion, free software, full transparency in public power, and the construction of public policies in a participatory and collaborative way.

[...] our goal as the Pirate Party is not to sell you another fake ideology, but to defend new principles and ideas (many not so new) originating from this new invention called the Internet and how it can inspire a new type of society where citizenship is not just pressing buttons in a specific period of time, but a constant participation in local affairs.

—Pirate Party: left or right?

== Organization ==
The Pirate Party is composed of the General Secretariat, the National Coordination, the National Treasury and the General Assembly.
