= Pirate Party – Slovakia =

Slovak Pirate Party Slovenská Pirátska Strana
- Leader: Silvester Buček
- Founded: 23.12.2011
- Headquarters: Slovenská pirátska strana Bratislava
- Membership: 30
- Ideology: Pirate politics Freedom of Information; Privacy; Intellectual property reform Direct democracy Transparency of government
- International affiliation: Pirate Parties International
- European political alliance: European Pirate Party
- Colours: Black/White
- National Council: 0 / 150
- European Parliament: 0 / 15

Website
- piratskastrana.sk

Slovak Pirate Party (Slovak: Slovenská Pirátska Strana, SPS) is a non-governmental organisation established in December 2011 as the Pirate Party of the Slovak Republic. The organisation is based on the model of the Swedish Pirate Party. The party is a member of the Pirate Parties International.

== Status ==
Two members of Slovak Pirate Party became candidates to the Slovak Parliament in the March 2012 election, enlisted on the ticket of the newly established political party Ordinary People and Independent Personalities - Peter Blaščák at number 70 and Martin Bibko at number 77.

== See also ==
- Slovak politics
