= Polish Pirate Party =

Polish Pirate Party Polska Partia Piratów (Piraci)
- President: Janusz Wdzięczak
- Founded: 23 July 2012
- Registered: 21 January 2013
- Headquarters: Marszałkowska 84/92 lok. 117; Warsaw
- Membership (2019): 100
- Ideology: Pirate politics Freedom of information Pro-Europeanism
- Political position: Centre
- International affiliation: Pirate Parties International
- European political alliance: European Pirate Party
- Sejm: 0 / 460
- Senate: 0 / 100
- European Parliament: 0 / 52
- Regional assemblies: 0 / 552
- City Presidents: 0 / 107

Website
- polskapartiapiratow.pl

The Polish Pirate Party (Polish: Polska Partia Piratów; Abbr.: Piraci, formerly P3) is a political party in Poland based on the model of the Swedish Pirate Party. It was founded on 23 July 2012, and registered on 21 January 2013, after a long process of registration.

A pirate party was first founded in Poland under the name (Polish: Partia Piratów) on 7 July 2006, and registered on 11 November 2007. Due to formal error, the party was de-registered in 2008. The party leaders opted to delay reregistration and focus on recruiting new members and establishing party structure. On 28 December 2009, it was removed from the register of political parties and ceased its activities outside the Internet.

In January 2013, the party was reregistered. Its first General Assembly took place on 18 May 2013.
