= Pirate Party Romania =

Pirate Party Romania Partidul Pirat Romania
- Founded: 2009
- Ideology: Pirate politics Freedom of information Privacy; Non-interventionist distributism Direct democracy Transparency of government
- International affiliation: Pirate Parties International

Website
- www.partidulpirat.ro

The Pirate Party Romania (Romanian: Partidul Pirat România) is a political party in Romania based on the Swedish Pirate Party. The party is a member of the international Pirate Party movement and is focused on copyright and patent reform, internet freedom, and government transparency.

The first website of the Romanian Pirate Party, officially named as Partidul Pirat "România", was launched on 9 June 2009, and the first online meeting was held on 19 July 2009. The same year, on 6 August, members held their first live meeting, while one month later, on 7 September, the first article regarding the party was published in the Romanian online media.

The ideology and political philosophy of the Romanian Pirate Party, as well as its core principles, were described by the ex-general secretary of the Pirate Party of Romania in a public statement on personal blog as being for construction of a Pirate State with confederation characteristics, direct and participatory democracy, Pirate Economy protecting and enhancing competition against monopolies and cartels, Pirate Civism for maximum free speech but protection against institutionalized discrimination and violence, against intellectual property, complete depolitization of the state, government transparency, absolute protection of whistleblowers, restructuring of the administration into a Confederal Pirate Parliamentary Republic instead of Semi-Presidential Republic.

== Party registration ==
In preparation for the official registration the party statute was approved by the founding members, and the first elected board was composed of Cristian Bulumac (President), Ştefan Marius Angelescu (Vice-President), Claudiu Marginean (Founding President), Ștefan Cristian Brîndușă (General Secretary) until early 2016, with a few exceptions.

On 11 February 2014 the party has submitted to the authorities the official request to be legally registered as a political party without the required signatures of 25,000 founding members.

In February 2015, the Pirate Party, among others, contested the electoral law at the Constitutional Court of Romania, arguing that the law violates freedom of association, the Constitutional Court heard the case of the Pirate Party leaders and admitted their contestation, overturning the section of the electoral law mandating the number of founding members.
