= Pirate Party of Austria =

Pirate Party of Austria Piratenpartei Österreichs
- Leader: Cosma Tieber, Gerald Kainz and Harald Bauer
- Secretary-General: Andreas Marek, Roland Schneider
- Founded: July 2006
- Ideology: Pirate politics Social liberalism
- National affiliation: Europa Anders (for the EU election of 2014)
- European political alliance: European Pirate Party
- Colours: Purple, black and white

Website
- www.piratenpartei.at

The Pirate Party of Austria (German: Piratenpartei Österreichs, PIRAT) is a political party in Austria and part of the global Pirate Party movement which advocates what has come to be known as Pirate politics. It is mostly known for opposing the Anti-Counterfeiting Trade Agreement. The party was founded by Florian Hufsky and Jürgen 'Juxi' Leitner during the run-up to the 2006 election in Austria, but failed to gather the necessary signatures to contest the election. On 14 March 2010, the PPÖ ran for municipal elections for its first time in the city of Bregenz and received 1.62% of the vote, however failed to win any seats.

Christopher Clay, Marlies Wawra, Rodrigo Jorquera, Lukas Daniel Klausner and André Igler have been elected on 28 October 2012 to board members in the General Assembly of the Pirate Party Austria. Albert Gugerell has been elected as treasurer.

In January Alexander Ofer, former member of the Tyrolean State Pirate Party, was expelled together with all state party members. After Ofer was elected to the city council the Pirate Party announced the launch of Pirate Party Tyrol (Ofer's new party he had founded before getting expelled. They successfully ran for a post in the city of Innsbruck). But Ofer said "Wir wollen mit der Piratenpartei Österreichs nichts zu tun haben, das sind Pfuscher." ("We don't want to have anything to do with the Pirate Party of Austria, they are botchers").

In 2012 the social-liberal daily newspaper Der Standard stated that the Pirates could be a competitor against The Greens and the Freedom Party, and could become the new Liberal Forum, with the Pirate Party Austria is heading for National Assembly in 2013 and EU Elections in 2014.

In municipal elections in Graz on 25 November 2012, the Pirates gained 2.68% of the vote and one seat.

On 4 March 2014 Salzburg Piratenpartei started a whistleblowing initiative; at the base of the initiative is the use of the GlobaLeaks software that enables anonymous whistleblowing.

On 10 December 2022 the Pirate Party left the Pirate Parties International; in the same vote they elected to remain an observer member of the European Pirate Party.

Alternate Logo
