= Pirate Party (Belgium) =

Pirate Party Piratenpartij/Parti Pirate
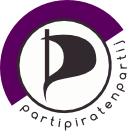
- Founded: 28 June 2009
- Headquarters: Brussels
- Ideology: Pirate politics Civil libertarianism
- International affiliation: Pirate Parties International
- European Parliament: 0 / 21
- Brussels Parliament: 0 / 89
- Flemish Parliament: 0 / 124
- Walloon Parliament: 0 / 75

Website
- http://pirateparty.be/

The Pirate Party of Belgium (Dutch: Piratenpartij, French: Parti Pirate) is a political party in Belgium. Based on the model of the Swedish Pirate Party, it supports reform of copyright law, the abolition of patents, and respect for privacy. It was a founding member of Pirate Parties International.

== Electoral participation ==
=== 2010 federal elections ===
The party participated for the first time in the federal elections of 13 June 2010, but only for the electoral district of Brussels-Halle-Vilvoorde, where they received 0.26% of the votes. Their only candidate (apart from successors) was Jurgen Rateau.

=== 2012 local elections ===
The party presented lists at municipal and provincial elections in Belgium in 2012, in 14 municipalities and 26 provincial districts. The provincial results were generally around 1% in Flanders and 3% in Walloon.

The best result they obtained was 3.42% in the provincial district of Tournai by Paul Bossu and at the communal level, 5.16% at Louvain-la-Neuve, the list led by Lionel Dricot. The pirates at Ottigines list-Louvain-la-Neuve were only 14 votes short of a seat.

=== 2014 federal and regional elections ===
In the federal election of 25 May 2014, the Pirate Party participated in the Flemish constituencies of Antwerp (0.98%), East Flanders (0.82%) and Limburg (0.71%) as well as the Walloon constituencies of Hainaut (0.80%) and Liège (0.63%).

In the simultaneous regional elections, the Pirate Party had candidates for the four major constituencies (i.e. not Limburg or Brussels) for the Flemish Parliament, and received 25,986 votes (0.62%) in total. For the Walloon Parliament, the party only competed in the constituency of Nivelles, where it received 3,612 votes (1.54% in the constituency and 0.18% for the entire election). Their result was again strongest in Louvain-la-Neuve with 2.49% in that municipality. The Pirate Party also competed in the French language group for the Brussels Parliament, where they received 3,026 votes (0.74%).

=== 2018 local elections ===
In the 2018 Belgian local elections, the Pirate Party presented a shared list with Volt Belgium under the name "Paars" ("Purple") in several municipalities, gaining 1,476 in Antwerp and less than one thousand in Brussels.
