= Pirate Party Switzerland =

- German name: Piratenpartei Schweiz (PPS)
- French name: Parti Pirate Suisse (PPS)
- Italian name: Partito Pirata Svizzera (PPS)
- Romansh name: Partida da Pirats Svizra (PPS)
- President: Jorgo Ananiadis
- Founded: 12 July 2009
- Headquarters: Piratenpartei Schweiz, 3000 Bern
- Ideology: Pirate politics Freedom of information Privacy; Liberalism; Direct democracy
- International affiliation: Pirate Parties International
- Colours: Orange

Website
- www.piratenpartei.ch www.partipirate.ch

The Pirate Party Switzerland (German: Piratenpartei Schweiz, French: Parti Pirate Suisse, Italian: Partito Pirata Svizzera, Romansh: Partida da Pirats Svizra) is a political party in Switzerland, based on the model of the Swedish Pirate Party. The party was founded on 12 July 2009 in Zürich, Switzerland, by about 150 people. By the end of February 2012, the PPS had around about 1,800 members.

The first election success happened on 7 March 2010, when Marc Wäckerlin was elected to the Winterthur city council.

Patrick Mächler of the PPS was head member of Pirate Parties International (PPI) from July 2009 to February 2010, the umbrella organisation of the international Pirate Party movement.

On 13 March 2011, the party achieved 0.8% of the votes in a local election in Lausanne. On 3 April, they obtained 0.56% of the vote in a regional election in Zurich. In the federal elections of October 2011, the party failed to win a seat, gathering 0.48% of the popular vote (11,616 votes). On 23 September 2012, PPS member Alex Arnold was elected as part-time mayor of Eichberg. He switched to the Christian Democratic Party in April 2014. In February 2013, Alexis Roussel took over as president and when Didier Bonny, a parliamentarian from Geneva, joined the Swiss Pirate Party on 26 April 2013, it was represented in a cantonal parliament for the first time.In February 2014, the Pirate Party Winterthur was able to defend its seat in the city parliament and more than double its voter share to 2.4%. Marc Wäckerlin was able to garner 3,830 votes as a candidate for the city council. In March 2014 Jorgo Ananiadis, Guillaume Saouli, Marc Wäckerlin and Kilian Brogli were elected as vice presidents.In March 2015, Guillaume Saouli and Stefan Thöni took over as co-presidents after Alexis Roussel resigned. The Pirate Party contested the 2015 Swiss parliamentary elections with a total of 54 candidates in the cantons of Bern, St. Gallen, Vaud, Valais, Zug, Zurich and its sister party in the canton of Aargau. A result of 0.84 per cent was achieved in the 2018 cantonal elections in the Mittelland-Nord electoral district of Bern with 6,120 party votes. At the Pirate Assembly in Zurich on 31 March 2019, the resigning Co-Presidents Guillaume Saouli and Kilian Brogli were replaced by Sylvia Oldenburg-Marbacher as the new Co-President and Fabian Rousseau as the new Co-President. Daniel Peter was elected as the new Vice-President, joining the previous Vice-Presidents Jorgo Ananiadis and Carlos Polo. The Pirate Party was represented by 54 candidates in the 2019 Swiss parliamentary elections in the cantons of Aargau, Basel, Bern, Vaud and Zurich. In 2019, Jorgo Ananiadis took over the now vacant position of Co-President. On 27 December 2020, the previous Co-President Sylvia Oldenburg stepped down and the previous Co-President Jorgo Ananiadis was elected president. At the same time, the Board was expanded to include two new Vice Presidents, Biljana Lukic and Philippe Burger. On 5 April 2025, the members confirmed their President Jorgo Ananiadis. Pat Mächler, Melanie Hartmann, Michel Baetscher and Renato Sigg were also newly elected to the Board.

== Change in number of members ==
- Party was founded. (12 July 2009, 150 people at the foundation)
- Federal elections in Germany, speaking press published several articles on the German Pirate Party. (3 October 2009, 500 members)
- Prevention campaign on violent video games, flash mob in Bern. (18 March 2010, 750 members)
- Wikileaks case, the site under the domain name wikileaks.ch belongs to Swiss Pirate Party. (3 December 2010, 950 members)
- Elections in Bern where the Pirate Party gets 9% of the vote. (16 September 2011, 1,425 members)
- Reached 2,000 members. (12 July 2012)
