= Pirate Parties International =

Non-profit, non-governmental political group

- Abbreviation: PPI
- Formation: 18 April 2010
- Type: International nongovernmental organisation
- Legal status: Association
- Purpose: Political
- Headquarters: Potsdam, Germany
- Members: Pirate parties and affiliated associations
- Chairperson: Keith L. Goldstein
- Vice-Chairperson: Grégory Engels
- General Secretary: Âlexander Isavnin
- Treasurer: Sebastian Krone
- Main organ: General Assembly
- Website: www.pp-international.net

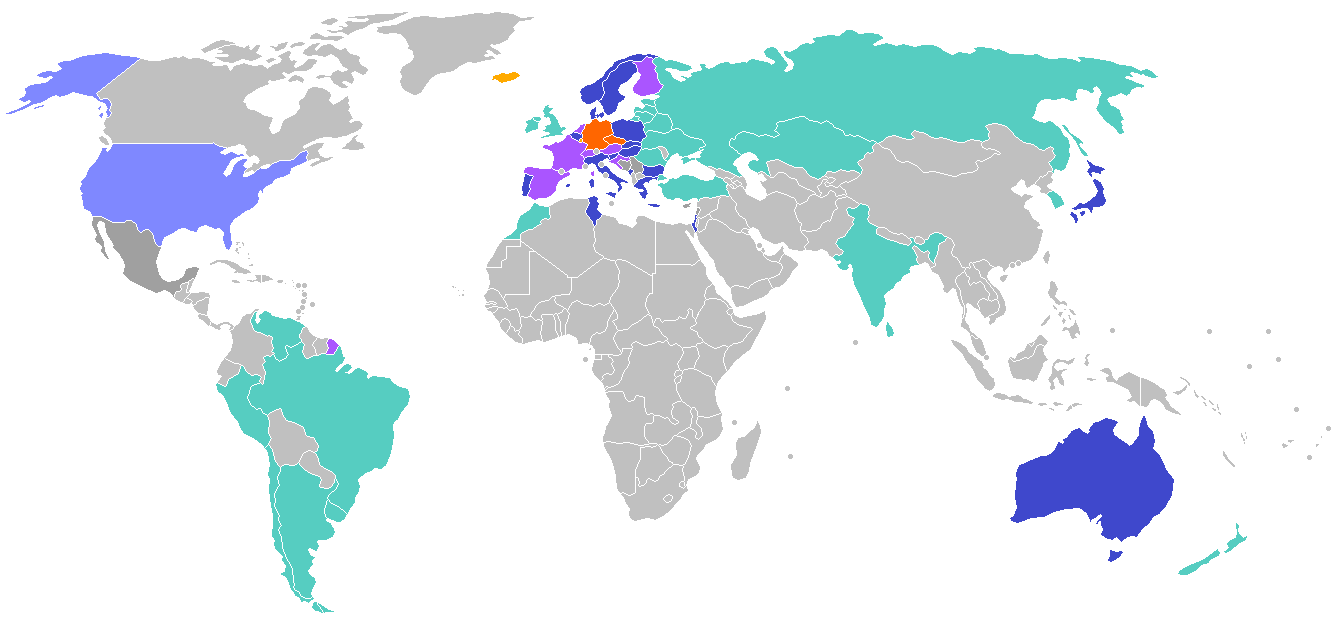
Elected in EU Parliament Elected nationally Elected locally Registered for elections Registered in some states Unregistered but active Status unknown

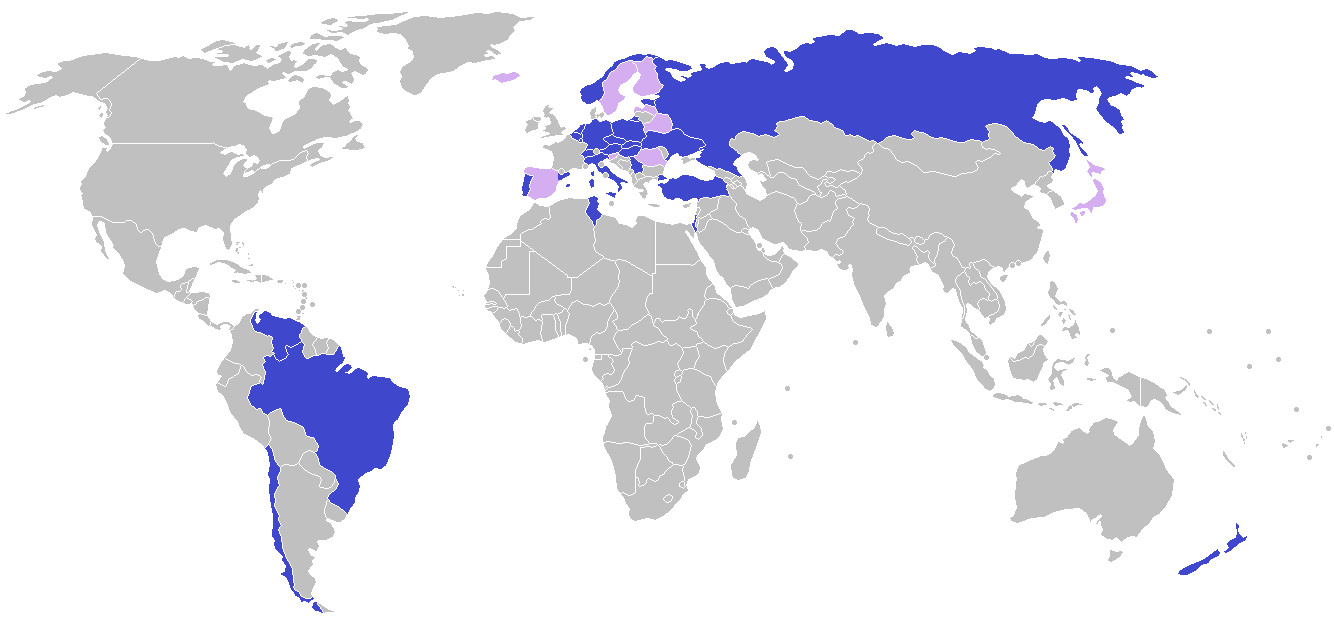
Ordinary members Observer members

Pirate Parties International (PPI) is an international non-profit and non-governmental organization with headquarters in Brussels, Belgium. Formed in 2010, it serves as a worldwide organization for Pirate Parties, currently representing 39 members from 36 countries across Europe, the Americas, Asia, Africa and Australasia. The Pirate Parties are political incarnations of the freedom of expression movement, trying to achieve their goals by means of the established political system rather than solely through activism. In 2017, PPI was granted special consultative status to the United Nations Economic and Social Council.

== Aims ==
The PPI statutes give its purposes as:

to help establish, to support and promote, and to maintain communication and co-operation between pirate parties around the world.

The PPI advocate on the international level for the promotion of goals its members share such as protection of human rights and fundamental freedoms in the digital age, consumer and authors' rights-oriented reform of copyright and related rights, support of information privacy, transparency, and free access to information.

The name "Pirates" itself is a reappropriation of the title that was given to internet users by the representatives of the music and film industry and does not refer to any illegal activity.

== History ==
The first Pirate Party was the Swedish Piratpartiet, founded on 1 January 2006. Other parties and groups were formed in Austria, Canada, Denmark, Finland, Germany, Ireland, the Netherlands, Poland, and Spain. In 2007, representatives of these parties met in Vienna, Austria to form an alliance and plan for the 2009 European Parliament elections. Further conferences were held in 2008 in Berlin and Uppsala, the latter leading to the "Uppsala Declaration" of a basic platform for the elections.

In 2009, the original Pirate Party won 7.1% of the vote in Sweden's European Parliament elections and won two of Sweden's twenty MEP seats, inspired by a surge in membership following the trial and conviction of three members of the ideologically aligned Pirate Bay a year earlier.

On 18 April 2010, the Pirate Parties International was formally founded in Brussels at the PPI Conference from April 16 to 18.

=== Uppsala Declaration ===
At the 2009 conference of Pirate Parties International in Uppsala (Sweden), European Pirate parties agreed on a common declaration of the parties' goals for the upcoming election of the European Parliament. Central issues of the declaration are:

- reform of copyright, exemption of non-commercial activity from copyright regulation, reduction of the duration of copyright protections; banning of DRM technologies, opposition to media or hardware levies;
- reform of patent law, particularly stating that patents on life (including patents on seeds and genes) and software should not be allowed;
- strengthening civil rights, transparent government, speedy and fair trial, freedom of speech, and expansion of the right to anonymity in communication.

=== Prague Declaration ===
At the conference of Pirate Parties International in Prague (Czech Republic) in 2012, European Pirate parties agreed to run in the elections to the European Parliament in 2014 with a common program, as well as to establish a European political party; the European Pirate Party (PPEU), a European political alliance was subsequently established in 2014. The declaration has been followed by conferences in Potsdam and Barcelona to work on the structure of the legal body to come and the statutes for it.

=== Hack the Promise Festival Basel 2025 ===
In 2025, Pirate Parties International board member Schoresch Davoodi presented the keynote "Hack the System – At Least a Little" at the Hack the Promise Festival in Basel. He reframed the hacker ethos as a democratic practice of precision, openness, and collaboration, arguing that defending freedom today means improving systems rather than destroying them.

=== Member Parties ===
As of 3 April 2026, the PPI lists the following 28 ordinary members with the voting power of 26 (parties sharing territory split the vote among themselves).

It must be noted, however, that the member party list mentions the Pirate Party of Australia both as an ordinary member and as a former member, without clarifying when the party rejoined, or removing it from the list of former ordinary members. Furthermore, the member party list still mentions the Pirate Party of Tunisia as an ordinary member, although it seems to be defunct. Similarly, it lists the United States Pirate Party as an ordinary member, although it voted to resign, criticizing the PPI for its stance on the Gaza Genocide and the Israeli occupation of the West Bank.

==== Africa ====
1. Pirate Party of Tunisia

==== Asia and the Pacific ====
1. Pirate Party of Australia
2. Pirate Party of Israel
3. Pirate Party of New Zealand (1/2 vote; vote shared with IP New Zealand below)
4. Internet Party New Zealand (1/2 vote; vote shared with PP New Zealand)
5. Pirate Party of Turkey (1/2 vote; vote shared with the other Turkish party)
6. Pirate Party Turkey (1/2 vote; vote shared with the other Turkish party)

==== Americas ====
1. Pirate Party of Brazil
2. Pirate Party of Chile
3. Pirate Party of Venezuela
4. United States Pirate Party

==== Europe ====
1. Pirate Party of Belgium
2. Pirate Party of Catalonia
3. (Czech Republic) Czech Pirate Party
4. (Estonia) Estonian Pirate Party
5. Pirate Party Germany
6. Pirate Party of Hungary
7. (Italy) Italian Pirate Party
8. Pirate Party Luxembourg
9. Pirate Party of Netherlands
10. Pirate Party of Norway
11. (Poland) Polish Pirate Party
12. (Portugal) Portuguese Pirate Party
13. Pirate Party of Russia
14. Pirate Party of Serbia
15. Pirate Party - Slovakia
16. Pirate Party Switzerland
17. (Ukraine) Ukrainian Pirate Community

=== Resignations ===
In February 2015, Pirate Party Australia resigned from PPI due to serious disagreement with the direction and management of the organization, but rejoined in December 2023. In the same month, Pirate Party UK also resigned and in March the Belgian Pirate Party suspended its membership within PPI.

On 20 April 2015, the Pirate Party of Iceland voted overwhelmingly to leave PPI. A member of the executive, Arnaldur Sigurðarson, reported a 96.56% vote in favor of leaving, adding: "PPI has been pretty much useless when it comes to its objectives which should be to encourage international cooperation between Pirate Parties."

In May 2015, the Pirate Party of Sweden resolved with a significant majority to leave PPI, canceling their observer status.

In July 2016, the Pirate Party of Canada officially withdrew from Pirate Parties International citing ongoing troubles with the organization as well as a failure to adequately provide any accomplishments over its history.

In 2022, the Pirate Party of Austria withdrew from the Pirate Parties International.

In December 2023, Florie Marie resigned from her role as chairperson of the Pirate Parties International after less than one year.

On 30 January 2024, the Pirate Party of France resigned.

On 1 June 2025, the Pirate Party of Greece's 12th Congress unanimously decided to leave the European Pirate Party and the Pirate Parties International, citing ideological issues, a lack of political added value, and a lack of room for "constructive and productive political discourse".

On 1 February 2026, the United States Pirate Party voted unanimously to officially leave Pirate Parties International, citing its stance on the Gaza genocide and the Israeli occupation of the West Bank, which it views as inconsistent with Pirates' universal promotion of the right to self-determination, as well as perceived incompatibilities in the affiliations and prior work of a senior PPI officer with Pirate principles. In their statements concerning their resignation and distancing from the PPI, they are also specifically and particularly critical of the Pirate Party Germany on this matter.

== Structure ==
The PPI is governed by a board, formerly led by two co-chairs, and since the Warsaw conference of 2015 by a chair and a vice-chair. Policy, governance, and applications for membership are the responsibility of the PPI General Assembly which must convene at least once per year. By the current rules, board members are elected for a two-year term, half of the board being elected every year. Since the 2019 General Assembly, the Board has 9 members (previously 7). General Secretary and Treasurer positions are filled by the board by its members.

PPI Board
No.	Term	Co-Chairs (chair & vice-chair from 2015 onwards)	General Secretary	Treasurer	Member of the board	Alternates
1st Board	IV/2010 III/2011	(Germany) Grégory Engels, (Luxembourg) Jerry Weyer	(Germany) Joachim Mönch	(Sweden) Nicolas Sahlqvist	(Serbia) Aleksandar Blagojevic, (Czech Republic) Jakub Michálek, (Bulgaria) Bogomil Shopov	–
2nd Board	III/2011 IV/2012	(Netherlands) Samir Allioui, (Czech Republic) Marcel Kolaja (receded)	(Russia) Lola Voronina	(Switzerland) Pat Mächler	(United Kingdom) Finlay Archibald (receded), (France) Paul da Silva (receded), (Germany) Thomas Gaul	–
3rd Board	IV/2012 IV/2013	(Germany) Grégory Engels, (Russia) Lola Voronina	(Canada) Travis McCrea	(United Kingdom) Ed Geraghty	(Portugal) Nuno Cardoso, (Serbia) Jelena Jovanović, (Switzerland) Denis Simonet	(Australia) Brendan Molloy, (Germany) Thomas Gaul, (Italy) Alessandra Minoni, (United States) Andrew Norton (receded)
4th Board	IV/2013 IV/2014	(Germany) Grégory Engels, (Czech Republic) Vojtěch Pikal	(Germany) Thomas Gaul	(Luxembourg) Marc Tholl	(Portugal) Nuno Cardoso, (Russia) Azat Gabrakhmanov, (Switzerland) Denis Simonet	(Serbia) Jelena Jovanović, (Belgium) Paul Bossu, (Poland) Radosław Pietroń, (Turkey) Yasin Aydın
5th Board	IV/2014 VII/2015	(Croatia) Maša Čorak, (Belgium) Koen de Voegt	(Germany) Thomas Gaul	(Germany) Sebastian Krone	(Germany) Grégory Engels, (Norway) Anders Kleppe, (Greece) Stathis Leivaditis	(Italy) Marco Confalonieri, (Turkey) Yasin Aydın, (Japan) Min Chiaki, (Tunisia) Chemseddine Ben Jemaa
6th Board	VII/2015 VII/2016	(New Zealand) Andrew Reitemeyer (chair) (Germany) Patrick Schiffer (vice-chair)	(Brazil) Henrique Peer	(Mexico) Karla Medrano	(Japan) Min Chiaki, (Tunisia) Chemseddine Ben Jemaa, (Switzerland) Dr. Richard Hill,	(Norway) Anders Kleppe, (Russia) Nikolay Voronov, (Belgium) Koen De Voegt, (Germany) Grégory Engels
7th Board	VII/2016 XI/2017	(Switzerland) Guillaume Saouli (chair) (Canada) Bailey Lamon (vice-chair)	(Germany) Thomas Gaul	(Israel) Keith L. Goldstein	(New Zealand) Andrew Reitemeyer, (Norway) Raymond Johansen, (Belgium) Koen De Voegt	(Russia) Nikolay Voronov, (Germany) Patrick Schiffer, (Germany) Adam Wolf, (Germany) Grégory Engels
8th Board	XI/2017 XI/2018	(Switzerland) Guillaume Saouli (chair) (Canada) Bailey Lamon (vice-chair)	(Israel) Keith L. Goldstein	(Germany) Thomas Gaul	(Belgium) Koen De Voegt, (Norway) Raymond Johansen, (Russia) Nikolay Voronov	(Germany) Adam Wolf, (France) Etienne Evellin, (Brazil) Daniel Dantas Prazeres, (Germany) Grégory Engels
9th Board	XI/2018 XII/2019	(Switzerland) Guillaume Saouli (chair) (Canada) Bailey Lamon (vice-chair)	(Israel) Keith L. Goldstein	(Czech Republic) Michal Gill	(France) Etienne Evellin, (Norway) Raymond Johansen, (Czech Republic) Ladislav Koubek	(Brazil) Daniel Dantas Prazeres, (Germany) Grégory Engels, (Canada) Kitty Hundal, (France) Cédric Levieux
10th Board	XII/2019 XII/2020	(Canada) Bailey Lamon (chair) (Germany) Grégory Engels (vice-chair)	(Israel) Keith L. Goldstein	(Brazil) Daniel Dantas Prazeres	(France) Cédric Levieux, (Germany) Thomas Gaul, (Czech Republic) Michal Gill, (Norway) Linda B. Tørklep, (Italy) Giuseppe Calandra	(Germany) Sebastian Krone, (Switzerland) Carlos Polo, (Norway) Svein Mork Dahl, (Italy) Cristina Diana Bargu
11th Board	XII/2020 I/2022	(Canada) Bailey Lamon (chair) (Germany) Grégory Engels (vice-chair)	(Czech Republic) Michal Gill	(Germany) Sebastian Krone	(Israel) Keith L. Goldstein, (Switzerland) Carlos Polo, (Chile) Manuel Caicedo, (Catalonia) Dario Castane, (Brazil) Daniel Dantas Prazeres	(Norway) Svein Mork Dahl, (Germany) Thomas Gaul, (Netherlands) Ji Yong Dijkhuis
12th Board	since I/2022	(Canada) Bailey Lamon (chair) (Germany) Grégory Engels (vice-chair)	(Czech Republic) Michal Gill	(Germany) Sebastian Krone	(Israel) Keith L. Goldstein, (Switzerland) Carlos Polo, (Chile) Manuel Caicedo, (Catalonia) Dario Castane, (Russia) Alexander Isavnin, (Chile) Mauricio Vargas	(Netherlands) Ji Yong Dijkhuis (Czech Republic) Veronika Murzynová (Germany) Adam Wolf (Germany) Sebastian Krone
13th Board	since I/2023	(France) Florie Marie (chair) (Germany) Grégory Engels (vice-chair)	TBD	TBD	(Israel) Keith L. Goldstein (Brazil) Michael Toledo (Canada) Bailey Lamon (Czech Republic) Michal Gill (Germany) Julian Häffner (Russia) Alexander Isavnin (Chile) Mauricio Vargas	(Germany) Mia Utz (Germany) Adam Wolf (Germany) Sebastian Krone (Czech Republic) Raman Ojha (Switzerland) Carlos Polo
14th Board	since I/2024	(Germany) Grégory Engels (chair) (Israel) Keith L. Goldstein (vice-chair)	TBD	TBD	(Canada) Bailey Lamon, (Russia) Alexander Isavnin, (Germany) Sebastian Krone, (Australia) Owen C. Richardson, (Brazil) Michael Toledo, (Germany) Julian Häffner, (Germany) Mia Utz	(Czech Republic) Raman Ojha, (Switzerland) Carlos Polo, (Germany) Thomas Gaul
15th Board	since I/2025	(Israel) Keith L. Goldstein (chair) (Germany) Grégory Engels (vice-chair)	TBD	TBD	(Canada) Bailey Lamon, (Russia) Alexander Isavnin, (Germany) Sebastian Krone, (Netherlands) Mark Anthony, (Brazil) Michael Toledo, (Czech Republic) Raman Ojha, (Switzerland) Carlos Polo, (Germany) Thomas Gaul	(Germany) Babak Tubis (Germany) Schoresch Davoodi, (Netherlands) Stefan Dekkers,
16th Board	since I/2026	(Israel) Keith L. Goldstein (chair) (Germany) Grégory Engels (vice-chair)	TBD	TBD	(Canada) Bailey Lamon, (Russia) Alexander Isavnin, (Germany) Sebastian Krone, (Netherlands) Mark Anthony, (Brazil) Michael Toledo, (Switzerland) Carlos Polo, (Russia) Grigorij Dizer	(Germany) Babak Tubis (Germany) Schoresch Davoodi, (Germany) Lilia Kayra Kuyumcu, (Germany) Numero6, (Netherlands) Bart Overkamp (Germany) Thomas Gaul

All board meetings are recorded and the minutes are published here: https://wiki.pp-international.net/wiki/index.php?title=PPI_Board/Board_Meetings.

== PPI Conferences ==
International Pirate Party Meetings
Name	Date of Meeting	Location	Host Party
International Conference 2007	8-10/6/2007	Vienna, Austria	
International Conference 1/2008	26-27/1/2008	Berlin, Germany	
International Conference 2/2008	27-29/6/2008	Uppsala, Sweden	
PPI Conference 2010 (Founding Conference)	16-18/4/2010	Brussels, Belgium	Pirate Party Belgium
PPI Conference 2011	12-13/3/2011	Friedrichshafen, Germany	Pirate Party Germany
PPI Conference 2012	14-15/4/2012	Prague, Czech Republic	Czech Pirate Party
Pirate Summer Conference	9-10/6/2012	Aarau, Switzerland	Pirate Party Aargau
PPI Conference 2013	20-21/4/2013	Kazan, Russia	Pirate Party of Russia
PPI Conference 2014	12-13/4/2014	Paris, France, on OpenSpace Conference	Pirate Party of France
PPI Conference 2015	4-5/7/2015	Warsaw, Poland, on OpenSpace Conference	Pirate Party of Poland
PPI Conference 2016	23-24/7/2016	Berlin, Germany	Pirate Party of Berlin
PPI Conference 2017	25-23/11/2017	Geneva, Switzerland	Pirate Party of Switzerland
PPI Conference 2018	3-4/11/2018, online continuation on 10/11/2018	Munich, Germany	Pirate Party Germany, Pirate Party Bavaria
PPI Conference 2019	7-8/12/2019	online	By video conference only
PPI Conference 2020 (w/out board election)	30/5/2020	online	By video conference only
PPI General Assembly 2020	6/12/2020	online	By video conference only
PPI General Assembly 2021 (w/out board election)	3/7/2021	online	By video conference only
PPI General Assembly 2022	8/1/2022	online	By video conference only
PPI General Assembly 2022 (w/out board election)	2/7/2022	online	By video conference only
PPI General Assembly	28/1/2023	online	By video conference only
PPI General Assembly	10/1/2026	Potsdam, Germany, hybrid	Pirate Party Germany, Pirate Party Brandenburg, hybrid by video conference
