= Pirate Party =

Type of political party

- Ideology: Pirate politics: Civil libertarianism; Anti-corruption; E-democracy; Direct and participatory democracy; Anti-copyright (reform or abolition); Software and Internet freedom; Anti-techno-authoritarianism (whether state-based or corporate); Antitrust

Pirate Party is a label adopted by various political parties worldwide that share a set of values and policies focused on civil rights in the digital age. The fundamental principles of Pirate Parties include copyright reform (dismantling copyright monopolies), patent reform, strengthening civil rights including government transparency, the right to privacy, anonymity, freedom of speech, secrecy of correspondence, the principle of subsidiarity, protection from arbitrary authority, and respect for the highest standards of democracy. The movement also advocates for freedom of information, freedom of the press, freedom of expression, digital rights, and internet freedom. The first Pirate Party (Swedish: Piratpartiet) was founded in Sweden in 2006 by Rick Falkvinge. Since then, the movement has expanded to over 60 countries.

== Ideology ==
Pirate Parties strongly defend open-source, decentralized and privacy-enhancing technologies, including blockchain, cryptocurrencies as an alternative to state currency (fiat money), peer-to-peer networks, instant messaging with end-to-end encryption, virtual private networks, private and anonymous browsers, etc., considering them essential tools to protect personal data, individual privacy, and information security (both online and offline), against mass surveillance, data collection without consent, content censorship without due process, forced decryption, internet throttling or blocking, backdoor requirements in encryption, discriminatory algorithmic practices, unauthorized access to personal data, and the concentration of power in Big Tech. Ultimately, the protection of individual freedom stands at the core of their political agenda, seen as a bulwark against the growing power of corporations and governments in controlling information and digital autonomy. This aligns with the cyber-libertarian values and principles.

Rather than completely rejecting the traditional political spectrum left–right, Pirate Parties operate on a distinct political axis that political scientists might call authoritarian-anarchist or centralized-distributed in the digital and technological spheres. Therefore, they tend to combine libertarian and anarchist elements on digital issues with progressive (from the American point of view) positions on social issues, while most political pirates support antitrust, enhancement and protection of free market competition against anti-competitive measures, be them state or private.

== History ==
The first Pirate Party to be established was the Pirate Party of Sweden (Swedish: Piratpartiet), whose website was launched on 1 January 2006 by Rick Falkvinge. Falkvinge was inspired to found the party after he found that Swedish politicians were generally unresponsive to Sweden's debate over changes to copyright law in 2005.

The United States Pirate Party was founded on 6 June 2006 by University of Georgia graduate student Brent Allison. The party's concerns were abolishing the Digital Millennium Copyright Act, reducing the length of copyrights from 95 years after publication or 70 years after the author's death to 14 years, and the expiry of patents that do not result in significant progress after four years, as opposed to 20 years. However, Allison stepped down as leader three days after founding the party.

The Pirate Party of Austria (German: Piratenpartei Österreichs) was founded in July 2006 in the run-up to the 2006 Austrian legislative election by Florian Hufsky and Jürgen "Juxi" Leitner.

The Pirate Party of Finland was founded in 2008 and entered the official registry of Finnish political parties in 2009.

The Pirate Party of the Czech Republic (Czech: Česká pirátská strana) was founded on 19 April 2009 by Jiří Kadeřávek.

The 2009 European Parliament election took place between the 4 and 7 June 2009, and various Pirate Parties stood candidates. The most success happened in Sweden, where the Pirate Party of Sweden won 7.1% of the vote, and had Christian Engström elected as the first ever Pirate Party Member of European Parliament (MEP). Following the introduction of the Treaty of Lisbon, the Pirate Party of Sweden were afforded another MEP in 2011, that being Amelia Andersdotter.

On 30 July 2009, the Pirate Party UK was registered with the Electoral Commission. Its first party leader was Andrew Robinson, and its treasurer was Eric Priezkalns.

In April 2010, an international organisation to encourage cooperation and unity between Pirate Parties, Pirate Parties International, was founded in Belgium.

In the 2011 Berlin state election to the Abgeordnetenhaus of Berlin, the Pirate Party of Berlin (a state chapter of Pirate Party Germany) won 8.9% of the vote, which corresponded to winning 15 seats. John Naughton, writing for The Guardian, argued that the Pirate Party of Berlin's success could not be replicated by the Pirate Party UK, as the UK does not use a proportional representation electoral system.

In the 2013 Icelandic parliamentary election, the Icelandic Pirate Party won 5.1% of the vote, returning three Pirate Party Members of Parliament. Those were Birgitta Jónsdóttir for the Southwest Constituency, Helgi Hrafn Gunnarsson for Reykjavik Constituency North and Jón Þór Ólafsson for Reykjavik Constituency South. Birgitta had previously been an MP for the Citizens' Movement (from 2009 to 2013), representing Reykjavik Constituency South. As of 2015, it was the largest political party in Iceland, with 23.9% of the vote.

The 2014 European Parliament election took place between 22 and 24 May. Felix Reda was at the top of the list for Pirate Party Germany, and was subsequently elected as the party received 1.5% of the vote. Other notable results include the Czech Pirate Party, who received 4.8% of the vote, meaning they were only 0.2% shy of getting elected, the Pirate Party of Luxembourg, who received 4.2% of the vote, and the Pirate Party of Sweden, who received 2.2% of the vote, but lost both their MEPs.

Reda had previously worked as an assistant in the office of former Pirate Party MEP Amelia Andersdotter. On 11 June 2014, Reda was elected vice-president of the Greens/EFA group in the European Parliament. Reda was given the job of copyright reform rapporteur.

In February 2015, the Pirate Party of Romania achieved a historic legal victory by successfully challenging the constitutionality of Romania's political party registration fundamental law. Starting the legal procedure in February 2014, the party demonstrated through an unconstitutionality procedure that a fundamental electoral law was unconstitutional. This led to the Constitutional Court of Romania changing the requirements for political party registration from a mandatory minimum of 25,000 signatures (with at least 250 signatures from a minimum of 17 counties) to only 3 founding members, a legislation that remains in effect today. Following this success, PPRO was automatically registered by its own constitutional change, marking it as one of the first political pirate parties in history to successfully change legislation without being part of Parliament. The Pirate Party of Romania had been attempting to register as a political party since June 2009, but was unable to do so due to Romania's strict party registration legislation.

The Icelandic Pirate Party was leading the national polls in March 2015, with 23.9%. The Independence Party polled 23.4%, only 0.5% behind the Pirate Party. According to the poll, the Pirate Party would win 16 seats in the Althing. In April 2016, in the wake of the Panama Papers scandal, polls showed the Icelandic Pirate Party at 43% and the Independence Party at 21.6%, although the Pirate Party eventually won 15% of the vote and 10 seats in the 29 October 2016 parliamentary election.

In April 2017, a group of students at University of California, Berkeley formed a Pirate Party to participate in the Associated Students of the University of California senate elections, winning the only third-party seat.

The Czech Pirate Party entered the Chamber of Deputies of the Czech Parliament for the first time after the election held on 20 and 21 October 2017, with 10.8% of the vote.

The Czech Pirate Party, after finishing in second place with 17.1% of the vote in the 2018 Prague municipal election held on 5 and 6 October 2018, formed a coalition with Prague Together and United Forces for Prague (TOP 09, Mayors and Independents, KDU-ČSL, Liberal-Environmental Party and SNK European Democrats). The representative of the Czech Pirate Party, Zdeněk Hřib, was selected to be Mayor of Prague. This was probably the first time a pirate party member became the mayor of a major world city.

At the 2019 European Parliament election, three Czech Pirate MEPs and one German Pirate MEP were voted in and joined the Greens–European Free Alliance, the aforementioned group in the European Parliament that had previously included Swedish Pirate MEPs and German Julia Reda.

=== Copyright and censorship ===
Some campaigns have included demands for the reform of copyright and patent laws. In 2010, Swedish MEP Christian Engström called for supporters of amendments to the Data Retention Directive to withdraw their signatures, citing a misleading campaign.

== International organizations ==
Elected in EU Parliament Elected nationally Elected locally Registered for elections Registered in some administrative regions Unregistered but active Status unknown

=== Pirate Parties International ===
Pirate Parties International (PPI) is the umbrella organization of the national Pirate Parties. Since 2006, the organization has existed as a loose union of the national parties. Since October 2009, Pirate Parties International has had the status of a non-governmental organization (Feitelijke vereniging) based in Belgium. The organization was officially founded at a conference from 16 to 18 April 2010 in Brussels, when the organization's statutes were adopted by the 22 national pirate parties represented at the event.

=== European Pirate Party ===
The European Pirate Party (PPEU) is a European political alliance founded in March 2014 which consists of various pirate parties within European countries. It is not currently registered as a European political party.

=== Parti Pirate Francophone ===
In Parti Pirate Francophone, the French-speaking Pirate Parties are organized. Current members are the pirates parties in Belgium, Côte d'Ivoire, France, Canada, and Switzerland.

== European Parliament elections ==
=== 2009 ===
State	Date	%	Seats
Sweden	7 June 2009	7.1	2
Germany	7 June 2009	0.9	0

=== 2013 ===
State	Date	%	Seats
Croatia^{*}	14 April 2013	1.1	0

^{*}Held in 2013 due to Croatia's entry into EU

=== 2014 ===
State	Date	%	Seats
United Kingdom^{1}	22 May 2014	0.5	0
Netherlands	22 May 2014	0.9	0
Austria^{2}	25 May 2014	2.1	0
Croatia	25 May 2014	0.4	0
Czech Republic	25 May 2014	4.8	0
Finland	25 May 2014	0.7	0
France	25 May 2014	0.3	0
Germany	25 May 2014	1.5	1
Greece^{3}	25 May 2014	0.9	0
Estonia^{4}	25 May 2014	1.8	0
Luxembourg	25 May 2014	4.2	0
Poland	25 May 2014	<0.1	0
Slovenia	25 May 2014	2.6	0
Spain	25 May 2014	0.2	0
Sweden	25 May 2014	2.2	0

^{1}Party only participated in North West England constituency
^{2}PPAT is in alliance with two other parties: The Austrian Communist Party and Der Wandel. The alliance is called "Europa Anders" and also includes some independents in their lists
^{3}with Ecological Greens
^{4}an independent candidate (Silver Meikar) who supported the European pirate movement program (helped out by members of the Estonian Pirate Party, which is not an official political party)

=== 2019 ===
State	Date	Votes	%	Seats
Czech Republic	24 May 2019	330,844	14.0	3
Finland	26 May 2019	12,579	0.7	0
France	26 May 2019	30,105	0.1	0
Germany	26 May 2019	243,302	0.7	1
Italy	26 May 2019	60,809	0.2	0
Luxembourg	26 May 2019	96,579	7.7	0
Spain	26 May 2019	16,755	0.1	0
Sweden	26 May 2019	26,526	0.6	0

=== 2024 ===
State	Date	Votes	%	Seats
Czech Republic	7–8 June 2024	184,091	6.20	1
France	9 June 2024	28,745	0.12	0
Germany	9 June 2024	186,773	0.47	0
Luxembourg	9 June 2024	68,085	4.92	0
Spain	9 June 2024	14,484	0.08	0
Sweden	9 June 2024	15,403	0.37	0

== National elections ==
Country	Date	%	Seats
Sweden	17 September 2006	0.6	0/349
Germany	27 September 2009	2.0	0/622
Sweden	19 September 2010	0.7	0/349
United Kingdom	6 May 2010	0.4	0/650
Netherlands	9 June 2010	0.1	0
Finland	17 April 2011	0.5	0
Canada	2 May 2011	<0.1	0
Switzerland	23 October 2011	0.5	0
Spain	20 November 2011	0.1	0
Greece	6 May 2012	0.5	0
Greece	17 June 2012	0.2	0
Netherlands	15 March 2017	0.3	0
Israel	22 January 2013	0.1	0
Iceland	27 April 2013	5.1	3/63
Iceland	29 October 2016	14.5	10/63
Iceland	15 September 2017	9.2	6/63
Iceland	25 September 2021	8.6	6/63
Iceland	2 December 2024	3.02	0/63
Australia	7 September 2013	0.3	0
Australia	2 July 2016	<0.1	0
Australia	18 May 2019	TBA	0
Australia (as Fusion Party)	21 May 2022	TBA	0
Norway	9 September 2013	0.3	0
Germany	22 September 2013	2.2	0
Austria	29 September 2013	0.8	0
Luxembourg	20 October 2013	2.9	0
Slovenia	13 July 2014	1.3	0
Sweden	14 September 2014	0.4	0
Israel	17 March 2015	<0.1	0
Finland	19 April 2015	0.9	0
United Kingdom	6 May 2015	<0.1	0
Germany	24 September 2017	0.4	0
Czech Republic	21 October 2017	10.8	22/200
Iceland	28 October 2017	9.2	6/63
Slovenia	3 June 2018	2.2	0
Sweden	9 September 2018	0.1	0
Luxembourg	14 October 2018	6.5	2/60
Israel	9 April 2019	<0.1	0
Finland	14 April 2019	0.6	0
Belgium	26 May 2019	0.1	0
Czech Republic	9 October 2025	9	18/200

== Elected representatives ==
Representatives of the Pirate Party movement that have been elected to a national or supranational legislature.

=== Pirate Party of Sweden ===
- Christian Engström, former MEP for Sweden (2009–2014)
- Amelia Andersdotter, former MEP for Sweden (2011–2014)

=== Czech Pirate Party ===
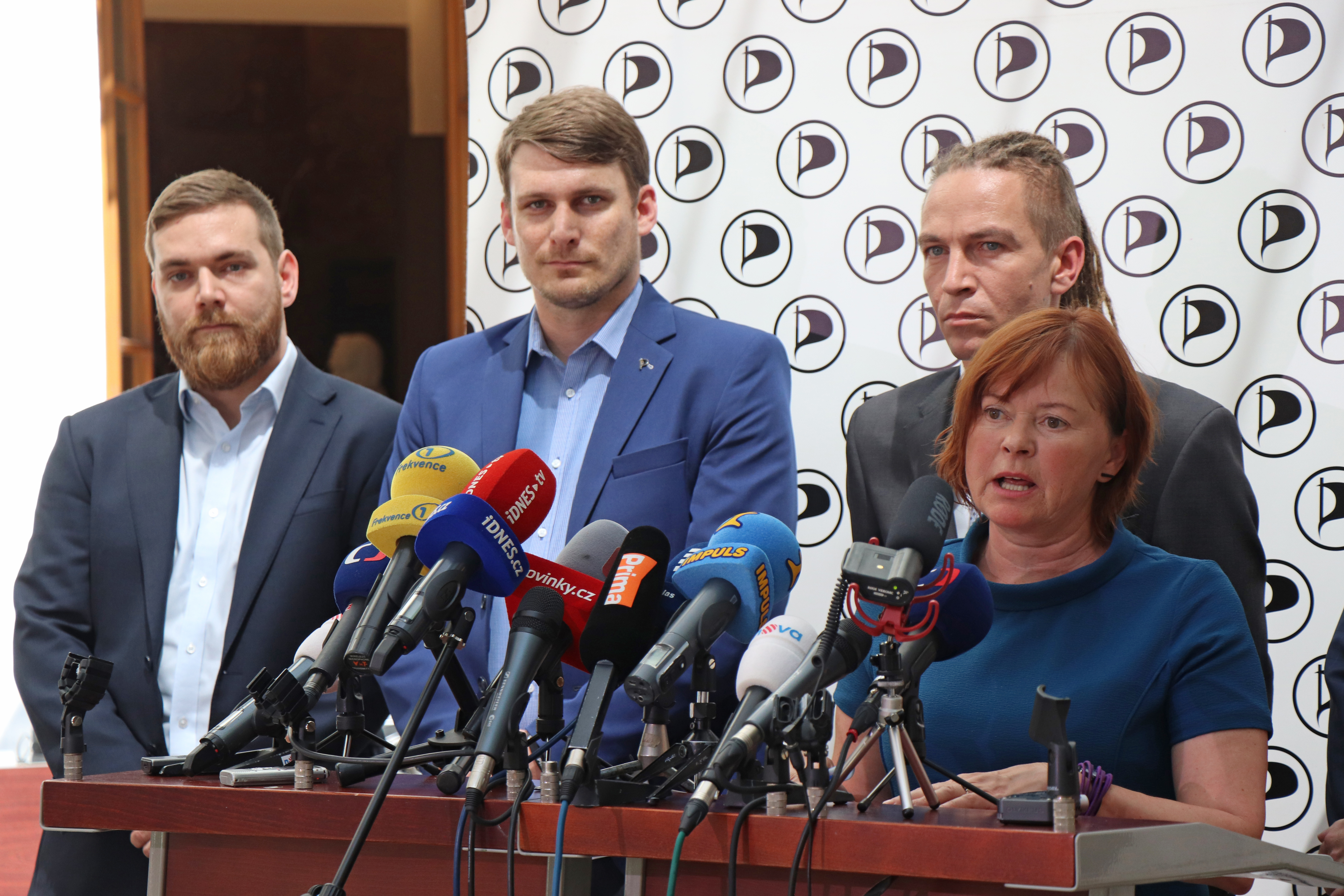
Czech Pirate Party MPs in 2019

==== Chamber of Deputies of the Czech Republic ====
Since the 2021 Czech legislative election, the following 4 MPs are in office:

- Jakub Michálek, MP for Prague (2017–)
- Olga Richterová, MP for Prague (2017–)
- Ivan Bartoš, MP for Central Bohemia (2017–2021), MP for Ústí nad Labem (2021–), Leader of the Czech Pirate Party and Minister of Regional Development (2021–2024)
- Klára Kocmanová, MP for Central Bohemia (2021–)

The following served as MPs during the 2017–2021 term:

- Dana Balcarová, MP for Prague
- Ondřej Profant, MP for Prague
- Jan Lipavský, MP for Prague, later the Foreign Affairs minister (2021–), though he left the Pirates in 2024 when the party left government.
- Lenka Kozlová, MP for Central Bohemia
- František Kopřiva, MP for Central Bohemia
- Lukáš Kolařík, MP for South Bohemia
- Lukáš Bartoň, MP for Plzeň
- Petr Třešnák, MP for Karlovy Vary
- František Navrkal, MP for Ústí nad Labem (2019–)
- Tomáš Martínek, MP for Liberec
- Martin Jiránek, MP for Hradec Králové
- Mikuláš Ferjenčík, MP for Pardubice
- Jan Pošvář, MP for Vysočina
- Radek Holomčík, MP for South Moravia
- Tomáš Vymazal, MP for South Moravia
- Vojtěch Pikal, MP for Olomouc
- František Elfmark, MP for Zlín
- Lukáš Černohorský, MP for Moravian-Silesian
- Ondřej Polanský, MP for Moravian-Silesian
- Mikuláš Peksa, MP for Ústí nad Labem (2017–2019), then elected to European Parliament

==== Senate of the Czech Republic ====
Since the 2024 Czech senate election, the party had 1 senator, but she left the Pirates in 2025. She is still a supporter of the Pirates.

The following are former senators:

- Adéla Šípová, Senator for Kladno (2020–2025)
- Libor Michálek, former Senator for Prague 2 (2012–2018)
- Lukáš Wagenknecht, former Senator for Prague 8 (2018–2024)

==== European Parliament ====
Since the 2024 EU elections, the party has 1 MEP:

- Markéta Gregorová, MEP for Czech Republic (2019–)

The following are former MEPs:

- Marcel Kolaja, MEP for Czech Republic (2019–2024)
- Mikuláš Peksa, MEP for Czech Republic (2019–2024)

=== Pirate Party Germany ===
Since the 2024 EU elections, the party does not have any national elected representatives. The former MEPs are as follows:

- Patrick Breyer, former MEP for Germany (2019–2024)
- Felix Reda, former MEP for Germany (2014–2019)

=== Pirate Party Iceland ===
Since the 2024 parliamentary election, the party does not have any national elected representatives. The former MPs are as follows:

- Andrés Ingi Jónsson, MP for Reykjavík North (2016–), originally as a member of the Left-Green Movement, member of the Pirate Party (2021–2024)
- Arndís Anna Kristínardóttir Gunnarsdóttir, MP for Reykjavík South (2021–2024)
- Björn Leví Gunnarsson, MP for Reykjavík North (2016–2017) and later for Reykjavík South (2017–2024)
- Gísli Rafn Ólafsson, MP for Southwest (2021–2024)
- Halldóra Mogensen, MP for Reykjavík North (2016–2024)
- Þórhildur Sunna Ævarsdóttir, MP for Southwest (2016–2017), for Reykjavík South (2017–2021), and for Southwest (2021–2024)
- Birgitta Jónsdóttir, MP for Reykjavík South (2009–2013), and for Southwest (2013–2017)
- Ásta Guðrún Helgadóttir, MP for Reykjavík South (2015–2017)
- Einar Brynjólfsson, MP for Northeast (2016–2017)
- Eva Pandóra Baldursdóttir, MP for Northwest (2016–2017)
- Gunnar Hrafn Jónsson, MP for Reykjavík South (2016–2017)
- Helgi Hrafn Gunnarsson, MP for Reykjavík North (2013–2016, 2017–2021)
- Jón Þór Ólafsson, MP for Reykjavík South (2013–2015) and for Southwest (2016–2021)
- Smári McCarthy, MP for Southwest (2016–2021)

=== Pirate Party Luxembourg ===
- Sven Clement, MP for Centre (2018–)
- Marc Goergen, MP for South (2018–)
- Ben Polidori, MP for North (2023–2024), left the party in 2024 and joined LSAP

== National parties ==
Outside Sweden, pirate parties have been started in over 40 countries, inspired by the Swedish initiative.

== See also ==
- Biopiracy – Harmful or unethical bioprospecting
- Copyleft
- Crypto-anarchy
- Criticism of copyright
- Internet freedom
- Piratbyrån
- Right to privacy
- Steal This Film
- The Pirate Bay
