= Marina Weisband =

German author, psychologist and politician

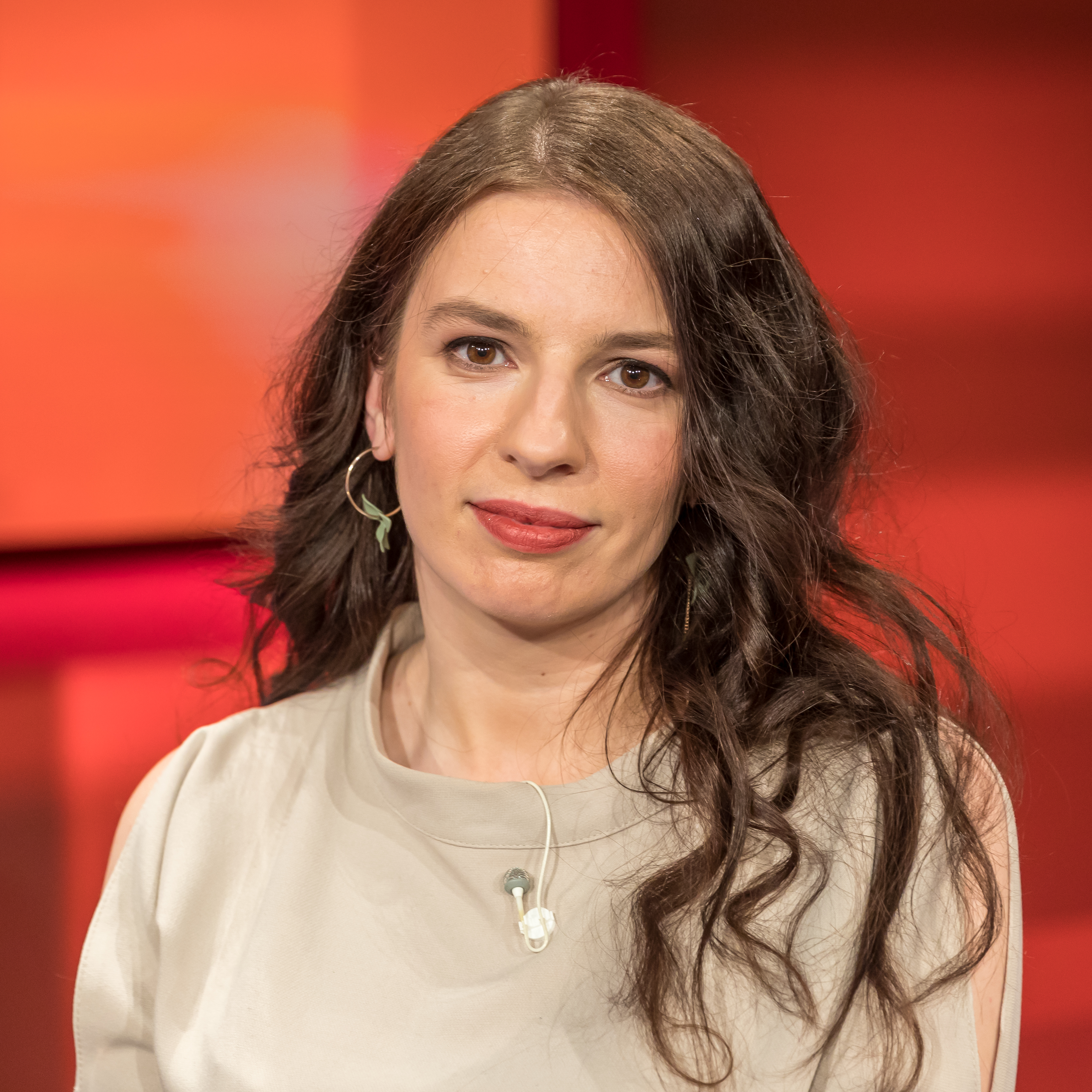
Marina Weisband, 2020

Marina Weisband (born 4 October 1987 in Kyiv) is a German politician. From May 2011 until April 2012 she was a member of the senior leadership of the Pirate Party Germany. In 2018 she joined the Green Party of Germany.

== Life and career ==
Weisband was born and raised in Kyiv to a Jewish family. In 1994, she and her family moved to Wuppertal in Germany under a program permitting Jews leaving the former Soviet Union to apply for refugee status in Germany. She finished school in 2006 and studied psychology at the University of Münster. In 2013, she gained her diploma.

Weisband joined the German Pirate Party in 2009. The Pirate Party won its first seats in a regional election in Berlin on 18 September 2011, gaining around 9% of the vote.

In April 2012, with support from other senior Pirate Party figures, she called on members of her party to tackle antisemitism and right-wing extremism within their own ranks. Der Spiegel suggested that the Pirate Party needed to dispel a perception that it was a sympathetic environment for radical extremists. Shortly afterwards Weisband announced she would not be seeking re-election next month, citing the need to focus on studying for her degree in psychology. She did not rule out a return to politics after graduating.

Weisband was the Pirate Party's most recognised face, appealing particularly to younger voters with her "laid-back style". In 2013 she published a book advocating direct, "liquid" democracy.

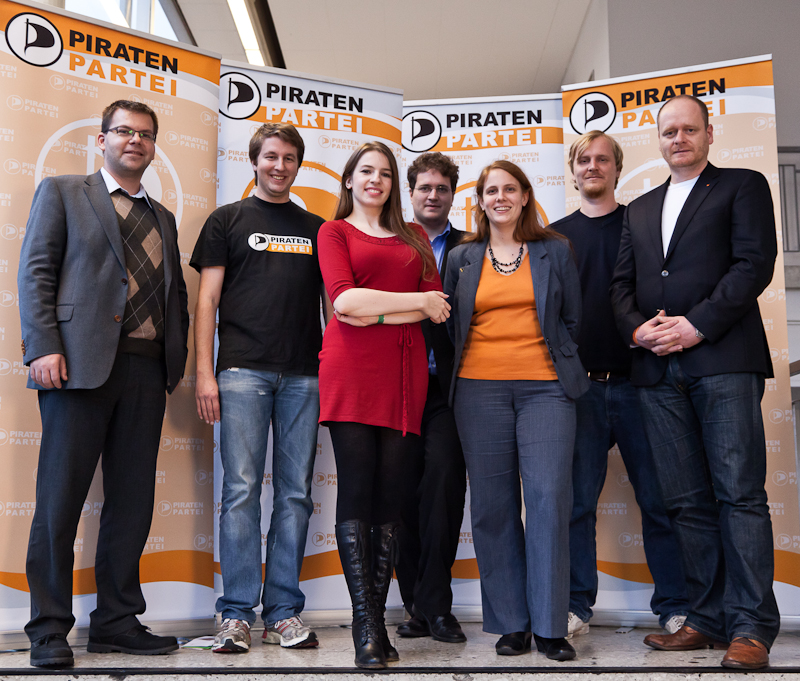
The Pirate Party leadership (2011). From left to right: Rene Brosig, Matthias Schrade, Marina Weisband, Sebastian Nerz, Gefion Thürmer, Wilm Schumacher, Bernd Schlömer

She revealed in September 2016 that she had left the Pirate Party the previous year and was focussing on the Aula project, an initiative to facilitate children's participation in politics using software she had developed that was being tested in four German cities. She lamented that the party had become dominated by conservatives. In 2018 she became member of the party Alliance 90/The Greens.

Weisband was a Pirate Party delegate to the Federal Convention for the purpose of electing the President of Germany in 2017.

Since 2014, Weisband is head of the student participation/democracy project "Aula".

== Personal life ==
Weisband describes herself as a believing, but not as an orthodox Jew. In June 2013 she married Marcus Rosenfeld. She lives in Münster.

== Sources ==
This article was abridged and translated from its equivalent in the German Wikipedia on 13 January 2012.

- Hank Pelissier, "Pirate Party captures big victory in Berlin, Germany!", interview with Marina Weisband, IEET, 29 September 2011, retrieved 13 January 2012.
- Susanne Messmer, "Eine, die alle lieben", Die Tageszeitung, 18 November 2011, retrieved 12 September 2016. (in German)
