= Susanne Graf =

German politician

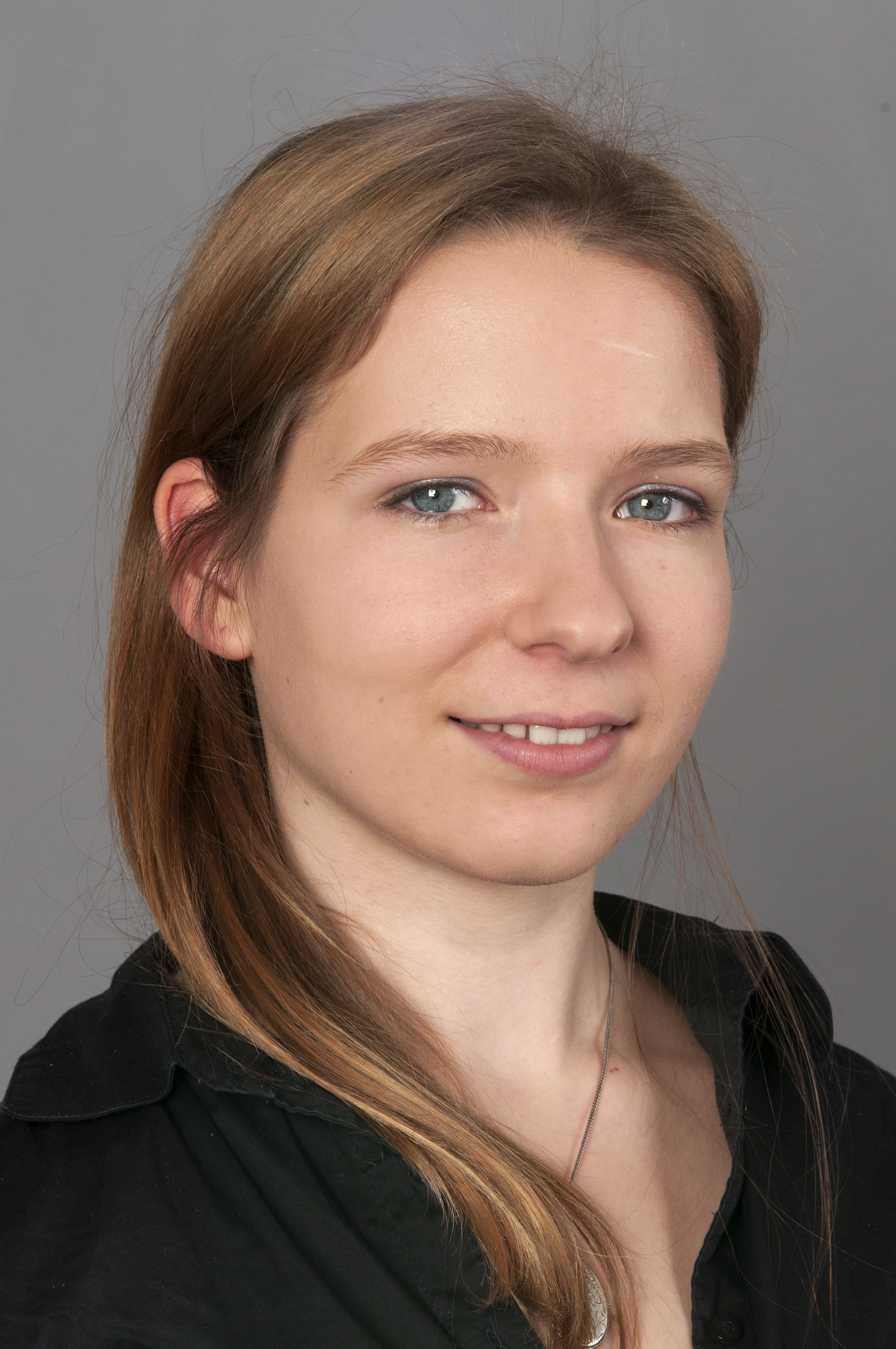
Susanne Graf (2015)

Susanne Graf (born 15 August 1992 in Berlin) is a German politician and member of the Pirate Party Berlin, a state chapter of the national Pirate Party. In the Berlin state election on 18 September 2011 she was elected to the state parliament in Berlin and served for one term until fall of 2016 without seeking re-election.

== Biography ==
Graf went to a high school ("berufliches Gymnasium") in Mühlhausen, which combines regular schooling with an apprenticeship in a technical profession (see dual education system). In the summer of 2011 Graf had graduated with a high school diploma and completed an apprenticeship in information technology. After that she got accepted into the Hochschule für Technik und Wirtschaft to study mathematical economics.

During her time in high school Graf was a member of the Chaos Computer Club and came in contact with the pirate party at the age of 16 when she was doing research for a school paper. Subsequently she joined the party in 2009 and became the vice president of its youth organisation in 2010. In 2011 she became a candidate for the party in the Berlin state election and got elected into the parliament on 18 September 2011.
