= Pirate Party of Berlin =

State chapter of the Pirate Party Germany in Berlin

Pirate Party Berlin Piratenpartei Berlin
- Chairperson: Simon Kowalewski
- General Secretary: Petra Stoll
- Deputy Leader: Alexander Spies
- Treasurer: Achim Weinberger
- Executive Director: Franz-Josef Schmitt
- Founded: 30 December 2006
- Youth wing: Young Pirates
- Membership (Jan 2, 2016): 884
- Ideology: Pirate politics Direct democracy
- National affiliation: Pirate Party Germany
- International affiliation: Pirate Parties International
- Colours: Orange

Website
- berlin.piratenpartei.de

The Pirate Party Berlin (German: Piratenpartei Berlin) is the state chapter of the Pirate Party Germany in the city-state of Berlin and was the first chapter of the Pirates to enter a Landtag (state parliament), getting elected to the Abgeordnetenhaus of Berlin in 2011. The party divides itself into so-called Crews (self-organizing units) at the local level. Work groups on specific themes are called Squads. Since 2010, the national association has used the software LiquidFeedback for intra-party decision-making.

== History ==
Summary of Berlin Pirate Party election results
Election	%
European Parliament election, 2009	1.4
2009 German federal election	3.4
Borough Assembly elections, 2011	8.5
2011 Berlin state election	8.9
2013 German federal election	3.6
European Parliament election, 2014	3.2

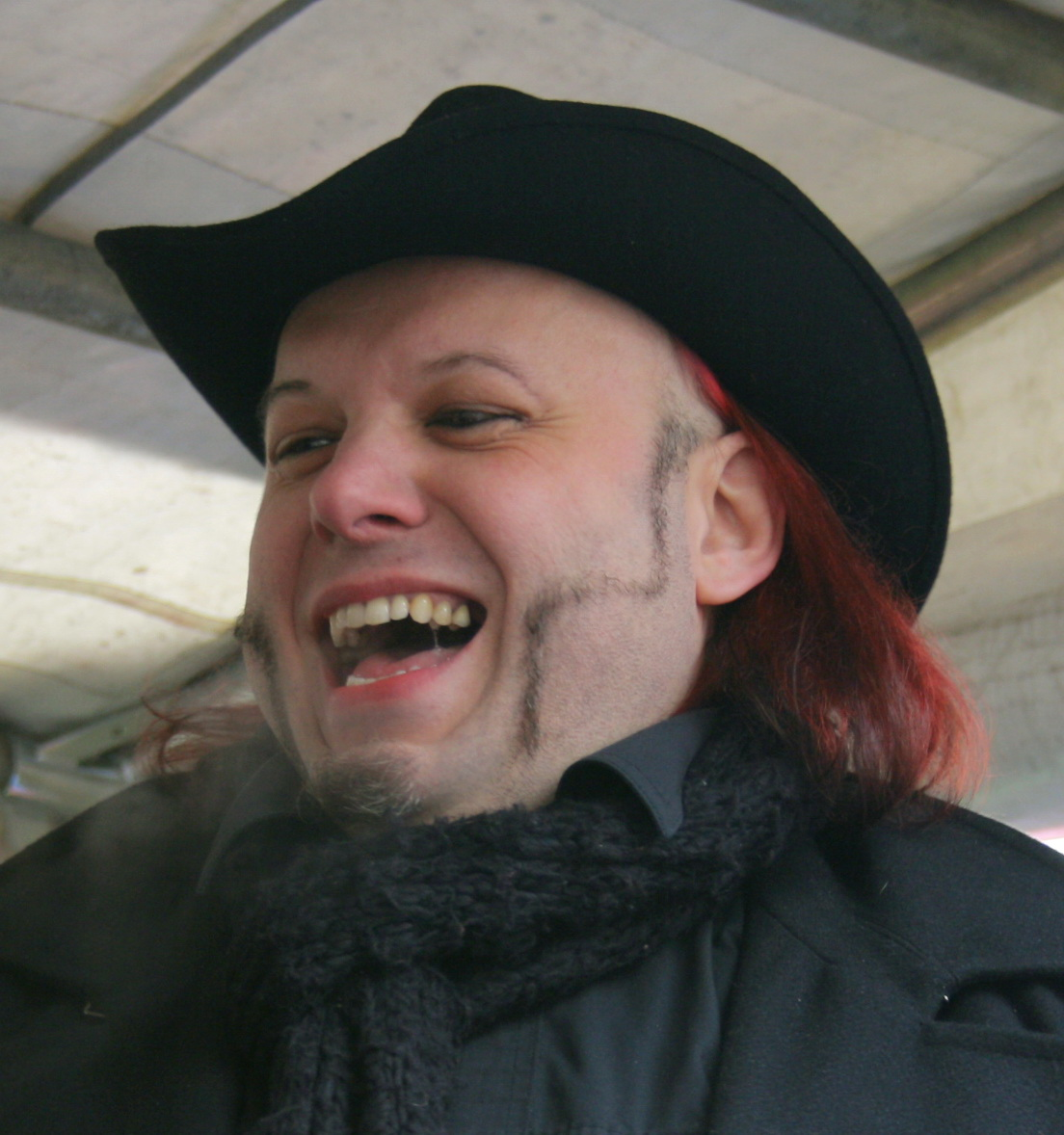
Bruno Kramm of Das Ich was elected PPB chair in 2014 and confirmed in 2015

The state chapter was founded 30 December 2006. During the 2009 federal election, the Berlin Pirate Party received 3.4 percent of the votes, which was their best showing at the national level. During the 2011 Berlin state election, the party entered a state parliament for the first time when they received 8.9 percent of the votes for the state parliament of Berlin. Lead candidate of the party list, Andreas Baum, was thus given a seat.

List of Chairpersons:

- 2007–2008: Andreas Janson
- 2008–2011: Andreas Baum
- 2011–2012: Gerhard Anger
- 2012: Hartmut Semken
- 2012: Christiane Schinkel
- 2012–2014: Gerhard Anger
- 2014: Christopher Lauer
- November 2014 – September 2016: Bruno Kramm
- September 2016 – present: Simon Kowalewski

== Political positions ==
One of the main concerns of the Pirate Party at the country level is transparency in politics and public administration. The Berlin Pirate Party pioneered livestreaming party meetings on the internet and making the records available for download.

As per its 2011 election programme, the Berlin Pirate Party advocates the promotion of alternative residential projects and cultural institutions as well as the preservation of open spaces in inner-city areas. It also opposes the so-called "Berlin Line" low-tolerance anti-squatting policy. The party is also in favor of a ticket-less public transport system in Berlin. The successful "Referendum on Disclosing Partial Privatizations of the Berlin Waterworks" (Volksentscheid über die Offenlegung der Teilprivatisierungsverträge bei den Berliner Wasserbetrieben) was supported by the Berlin Pirates. For Berlin schools, the party also supports ethical education on drug use ("Drug Maturity" model). The party also wants to remove the minimum voting age clause for Berlin state parliament elections. In addition, three chapters of their party's basic program are devoted to animal welfare.

== Representatives in the state parliament ==
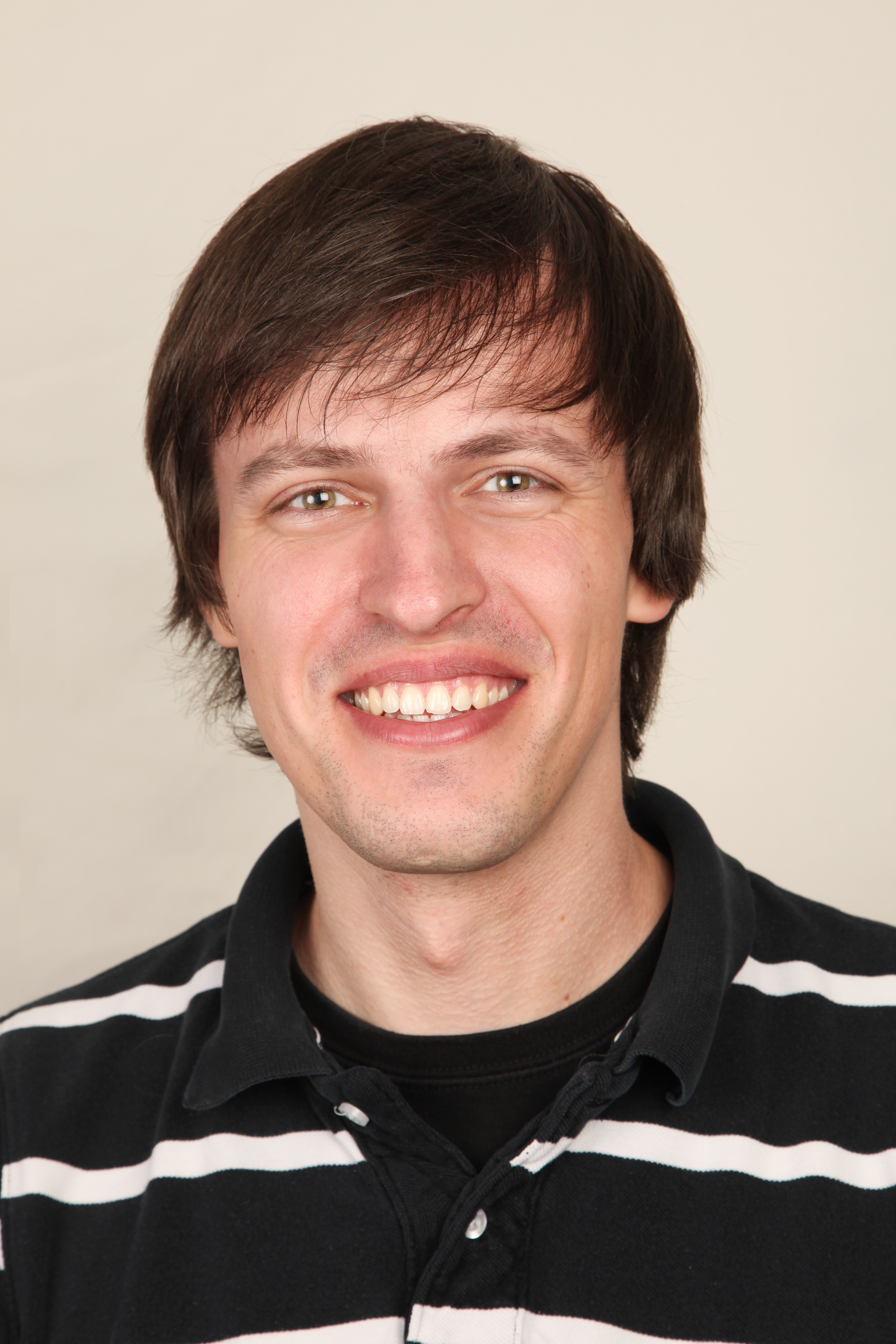
2011 lead candidate Andreas Baum

In the state parliament of Berlin (Abgeordnetenhaus von Berlin), all 15 Pirate Party candidates (14 men and 1 woman) were elected directly through their mandate. Of the parties in the state parliament, the Pirates have the lowest percentage of female representatives, with only 6.6 percent.

Because of double candidacies, three seats in the Borough Assembly (BVV) in Friedrichshain-Kreuzberg could not be filled. Because of this, the pirates could not take city council posts for which they were eligible.

- Andreas Baum (*)
- Gerwald Claus-Brunner
- Martin Delius (*)
- Susanne Graf
- Heiko Herberg
- Oliver Höfinghoff (*)
- Simon Kowalewski
- Christopher Lauer (*)
- Philipp Magalski
- Pavel Mayer (*)
- Alexander Morlang
- Wolfram Prieß
- Fabio Reinhardt
- Alexander Spies
- Simon Weiß (*)

(*) During 2014-2015, Baum, Delius, Herberg, Höfinghoff, Lauer, Mayer und Weiß laid down their party membership, but continued to work with the remaining PPB parliamentary group.

== Representatives in Borough Assemblies ==
The Pirate Party is represented in all 12 borough assemblies in Berlin. In five assemblies, the pirates cannot fully occupy their allocated seats because they received more seats than they had candidates. The following table shows the number of seats per district and, in parentheses, the number of vacant seats:

Charlottenburg-Wilmersdorf	Friedrichshain-Kreuzberg	Lichtenberg	Marzahn-Hellersdorf	Mitte	Neukölln	Pankow	Reinickendorf	Spandau	Zehlendorf	Schöneberg	Köpenick
4	5 (+4)	5	4 (+1)	4 (+2)	4	6	4	3 (+1)	3	4	4 (+1)

== Collapse of Vote Berlin State Elections 2016 ==
The Berlin state election on September witnessed the collapse of support for the Pirate party in their previous stronghold of Berlin. Their previous vote of 8.9% achieved in 2011 fell to 1.7% and the Pirate party lost all representation in the Berlin State assembly. The poor result was compounded by the murder suicide of former Pirate party assembly member Gerwald Claus-Brunner who wheeled the body of a young man whom he had murdered through the streets of Berlin in a handcart.

== See also ==
- Pirate Party Germany
- Pirate Party
