= Patrick Breyer =

German politician and activist (born 1977)

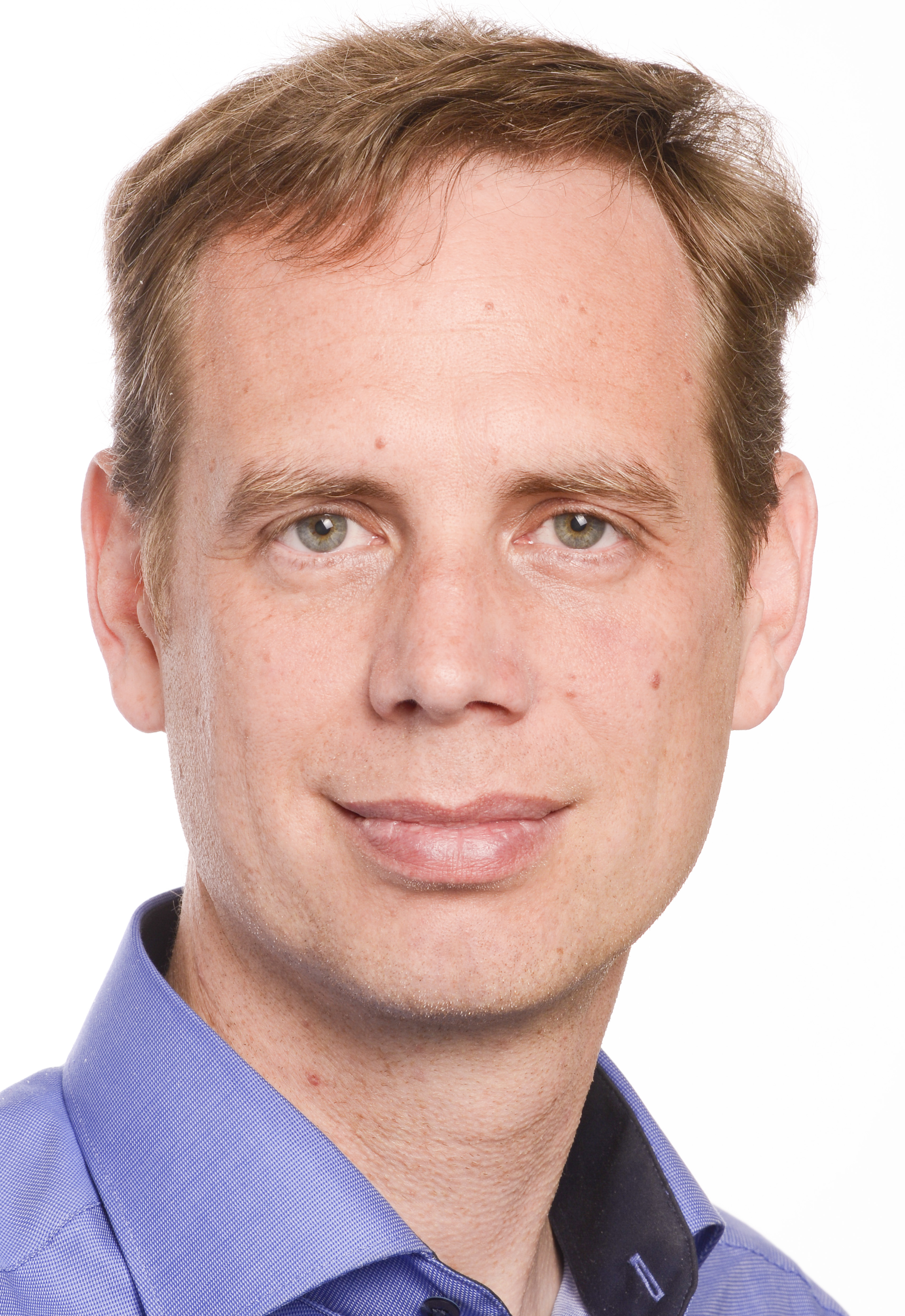

Member of the European Parliament for Germany
- In office 2 July 2019 – 16 July 2024

Member of the Landtag of Schleswig-Holstein
- In office 6 May 2012 – 6 May 2017

Personal details
- Born: Patrick Olaf Breyer; 29 April 1977 (age 49) Frankfurt am Main, West Germany
- Party: Germany: Pirate Party Germany (European Union) EU Party: European Pirate Party (European Union) EU Parliament group: Greens/EFA
- Website: www.patrick-breyer.de

Patrick Olaf Breyer (born 29 April 1977) is a German digital rights activist, jurist, Pirate Party Germany politician, and from 2019 to 2024, Member of the European Parliament (MEP). From 2012 to 2017 he was a member of the state parliament of Schleswig-Holstein and from April 2016 until the end of the legislative period he was also the leader of the Pirate group in that assembly. Breyer was one of four European Pirate Party MEPs in the 2019–2024 term along with three Czech Pirate Party members, all of whom are members of the Greens / EFA parliamentary group.

== Life ==
Patrick Breyer lives in Kiel. He studied law and was awarded a Doctorate of Law in 2004 at the Goethe University Frankfurt with his thesis on The systematic recording and retention of telecommunications traffic data for government purposes in Germany (Data retention). In 2004 he was appointed a judge in the state of Schleswig-Holstein. In 2006 he became a founding member of the Pirate Party Germany.

== Political activity ==
=== Legal proceedings concerning digital civil rights ===
Breyer is involved in the Working Group on Data Retention for Information privacy and civil and political rights and was involved in the organization of the successful class action lawsuit against data retention, together with the lawyer Meinhard Starostik, later a judge at the Constitutional Court of the State of Berlin. In 2016 he again filed a constitutional complaint against the new law on data retention.

In 2012, the Federal Constitutional Court declared legislation on government access to telecommunications subscriber data to be partially unconstitutional in response to an appeal filed by Breyer. Breyer and Katharina Nocun again challenged the revised regulation before the Federal Constitutional Court. The complaint was successfully upheld on 27 May 2020. Breyer also filed a complaint with the European Court of Human Rights against the compulsory identification of prepaid SIM cards, but this was dismissed in 2020.

In 2012 Breyer filed a lawsuit against the European Commission for the release of documents on data retention and won in two instances.

Breyer filed an action for injunction against the Federal Republic of Germany at the Berlin-Tiergarten District Court in 2008. The action was directed against the general and indiscriminate retention of user IP addresses in logfiles when browsing government websites (so-called "surf logging"). After the district court had dismissed the complaint in its judgment of 13 August 2008, the Landgericht Berlin granted the request in part in its judgment of 31 January 2013. Breyer and the Federal Republic of Germany filed an appeal against the decision. On 19 October 2016, the European Court of Justice ruled on the basis of a submission by the Federal Court of Justice that dynamically assigned IP addresses represent personal data for the operator of a website if they can be traced to the subscriber in the course of criminal proceedings. On 16 May 2017 the Federal Court of Justice ruled that dynamically assigned IP addresses are personal data. Web site operators may only store them if this is necessary to ensure the general functioning of their services and if the interest and the fundamental rights and freedoms of the users do not take precedence. The Federal Court of Justice referred the case back to the Berlin Regional Court, where as of July 2017 it was still pending.

In May 2018, Breyer filed a constitutional complaint against the new authority of the Federal Police to carry out automatic number plate readings at border crossings. At the end of 2018 he announced that he would file a complaint against the automatic reading of vehicle registration plates within the framework of "Section Control" in Lower Saxony, and in March 2019 he filed the complaint with the organization "freiheitsfoo".

=== Member of the Schleswig-Holstein Landtag ===
In the 2012 Schleswig-Holstein state election, Breyer was elected to the Landtag from the list presented by the Pirate Party of Schleswig-Holstein and on 21 May 2012 was chosen by that party's parliamentary group to be its leader in the chamber. He held the chair until the regular election of the parliamentary party executive committee on 21 May 2013. Between November 2012 and April 2017, Breyer transferred dietary allowances in the total amount of 75,159.18 euros to a donation account of the State of Schleswig-Holstein under the purpose "Reduction of new debt". He justified this, among other things, by the fact that only 1% of all taxpayers nationwide would have an income comparable to that of parliamentary group chairmen and that there should be no first and second class members of parliament because of the parliamentary group chairmanship.

In January 2013 Breyer criticized the vending machine industry, claiming that the sector "especially [that part of it] around Mr Paul Gauselmann, [had] been lubricating politicians of all established parties with large donations for years". Gauselmann had him warned against this, but Breyer did not issue a cease-and-desist declaration.

In the summer of 2014, Breyer published on his website police and judicial orders of danger zones in Schleswig-Holstein, previously sent by email from the Ministry of the Interior, within which police checks were permitted without justification. In the more than 100-page documents, the Ministry of the Interior had only partially redacted (blacked out) the names, official telephone numbers, and email addresses of the police officers in charge of the case, some of whom are also investigating the criminal Outlaw motorcycle club. After the problem became known, Breyer publicly apologized for not having checked the documents sufficiently before publication and deleted the police officer data. He was criticized across party lines. The Gewerkschaft der Polizei filed criminal charges against Breyer. The public prosecutor's office did not initiate an investigation, as there were no sufficient actual indications of criminal offences. In an expert opinion, Thilo Weichert, the data protection commissioner, objected in several points to the actions of the Ministry of the Interior in sending the requested danger area orders. The Ministry had not carried out its redaction effectively or completely. Whether the documents classified as "for official use only" (VS-NfD) had in fact had to be classified in this way was at best questionable. An explicit reference should have been made to the intentional confidential treatment. However, the Member of Parliament would also have had to take confidentiality and protection of secrecy into account when exercising his rights.

Breyer was "by far the most hard-working parliamentarian with a total of 356 initiatives" in the legislative period of the Schleswig-Holstein state parliament running since 2012, reported Die Welt at the end of 2015 with reference to the information system of the state parliament.

On 17 February 2016 Breyer awarded the Green-Red-Blue coalition an "ostrich prize for extraordinary achievements in delaying important reforms in our country". During the plenary debate, SPD chairman Ralf Stegner was presented with a bird ostrich mannequin. Breyer accused the coalition of using postponement and procrastination to prevent "repeated decisions by the state parliament on uncomfortable reform initiatives" by the Pirate faction, including the introduction of a waiting period for changing ministers to work in industry. State parliament president Klaus Schlie (CDU) issued Breyer with a formal reprimand.

On 12 April 2016 Breyer was re-elected chairman of the Pirate parliamentary group.

In May 2016 Breyer revealed accusations that male cadets at the Eutin Police Academy had displayed openly misogynistic, sexist, and racist behaviour towards their female fellow students and that the Ministry of the Interior had remained inactive despite knowledge of the matter (the so-called "Whatsapp affair"). As a result of the revelations, one police student was refused entry into the service. In addition, the head of the academy had been replaced in what was claimed to be no more than a routine rotation of posts. A committee of inquiry is currently investigating the case.

In autumn 2016 Breyer became the Pirate Party of Schleswig-Holstein's leading candidate in the state elections.

In December 2016 and February 2017, in the state parliament, Breyer criticized the fact that the heads of the state audit office and the state constitutional court had been appointed by the other parties without a public invitation to tender according to party proportional representation. The president of the state parliament called him to order and instructed him to withdraw his speech. In order to defend his right to criticize what he called "job pushing", Breyer called in the State Constitutional Court. The court declared the call to order unconstitutional on 17 May 2017. On 27 March 2017 Breyer was awarded the Horst Lütje Foundation's "Backbone Prize", endowed with 1,000 Euros, for his efforts.

In May 2017, Breyer uncovered accusations by criminal investigators that exculpatory statements in criminal proceedings against "rockers" had been suppressed and bullying had been used in response to criticism (the so-called "Rocker Affair"). As a result of the revelations, the head of the police department in the Ministry of the Interior as well as the heads of the state criminal investigation department and the state police office were obliged to resign. A parliamentary committee of inquiry is currently investigating the case.

In the 2017 state elections the Pirate Party failed to win any seats in the state parliament. With 1.2% of the vote it scored seven percentage points less than five years earlier. This ended Breyer's mandate.

As a representative of the "People's Initiative for Co-Determination", Breyer handed more than 20,000 citizens' signatures to the state parliament in December 2017. In May 2018 Breyer, as a representative of the "People's Initiative for the Protection of Water", which demands a legal ban on fracking, delivered more than 42,000 citizens' signatures to the President of the State Parliament.

=== European Parliament 2019-2024 ===
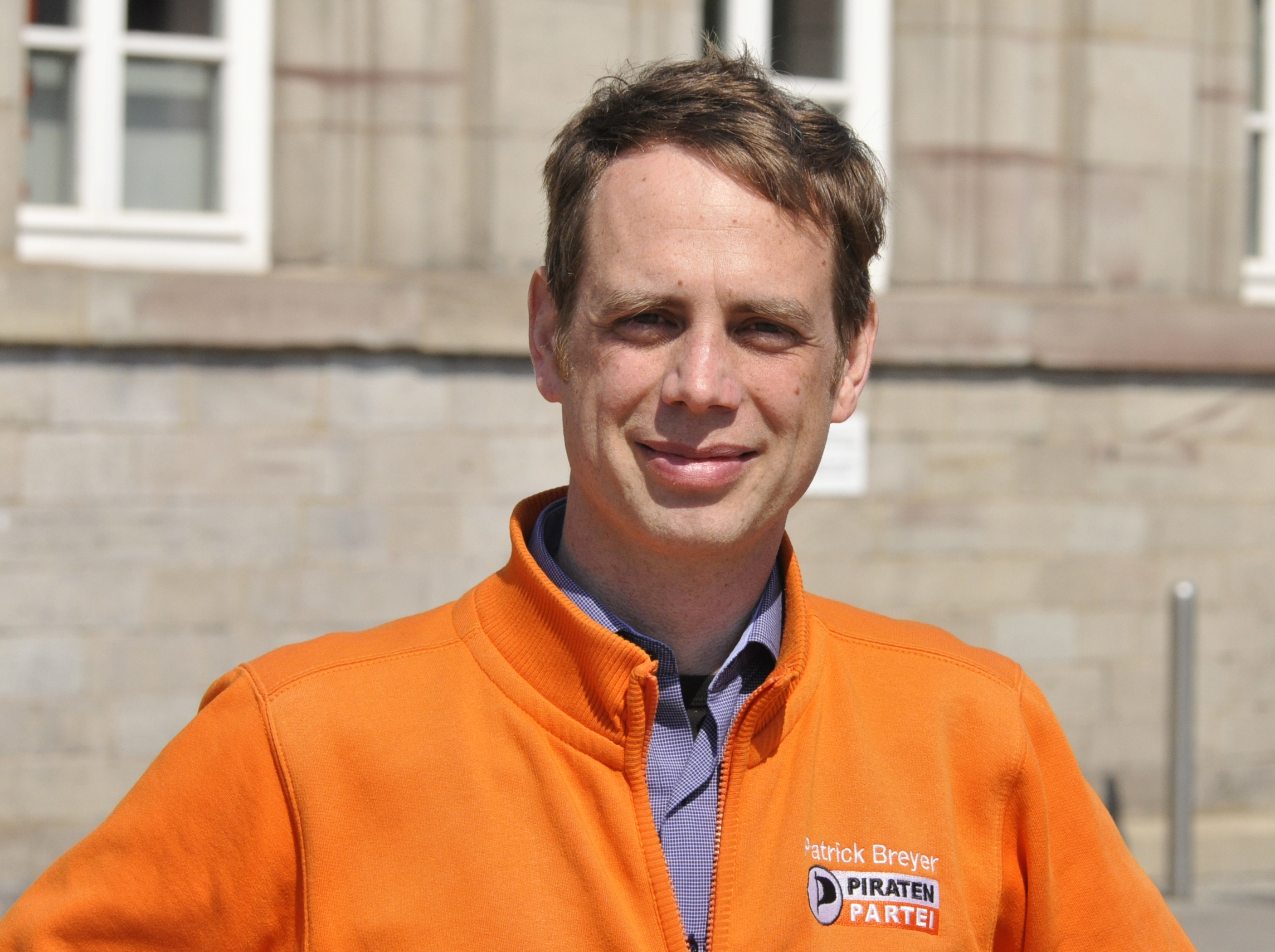
Breyer in 2019

In the 2019 European Parliament election in Germany Breyer was the Pirate Party Germany's leading candidate. For the election campaign, he recorded a rap music video, which featured such other well-known pirates as Anja Hirschel.

In March 2019 Breyer filed a lawsuit against the EU Commission on the grounds that it was in possession of secret project documents relating to new kinds of video lie detectors intended for entry control, including an ethical and legal evaluation of the technology, on the grounds of protecting the commercial interests of the companies involved.

Breyer was the only member of the German Pirate Party to be elected to the European Parliament, where he now sits, together with three members of the Czech Pirate Party who were elected at the same time, as one of a total of four members composing the Pirate Party in the parliament. He joined the Greens–European Free Alliance group, as Felix Reda had done in the previous legislature, and so too did the three Czech pirates. For his group, Breyer was a member of the European Parliament Committee on Civil Liberties, Justice and Home Affairs and an alternate member of the European Parliament Committee on Legal Affairs.

Breyer did not run for office in the 2024 European Parliament election.

=== Evaluation ===
Among his top achievements in the EU, Breyer counts the fight for freedom of choice, digitalisation, and transparency; preventing chat control, mandatory health record collections, and upload filters; revealing and sounding the alarm on EU surveillance research and plans.

== Works ==
- The systematic recording and retention of telecommunications traffic data for government purposes in Germany (traffic data retention). Edited: November 2004; Rhombos, Berlin 2005,ISBN 3-937231-46-3 (Volltext).
