= Nerz =

Nerz is a surname of German origin. It means "mink" in English. Notable persons with that surname include:

- Dominik Nerz (born 1989), German road cyclist
- Joachim Nerz (born 1964), German botanist
- Louis Nerz (1866–1938), Austrian screenwriter and actor
- Otto Nerz (1892–1949), German football manager
- Sebastian Nerz (born 1983), German bioinformatician and politician (Pirates)
