= Schlömer =

Schlömer is a surname. Notable people with the surname include:

- Bernd Schlömer (born 1971), German politician
- Helmuth Schlömer (1893–1995), German Wehrmacht general
