= Gerwald Claus-Brunner =

German politician

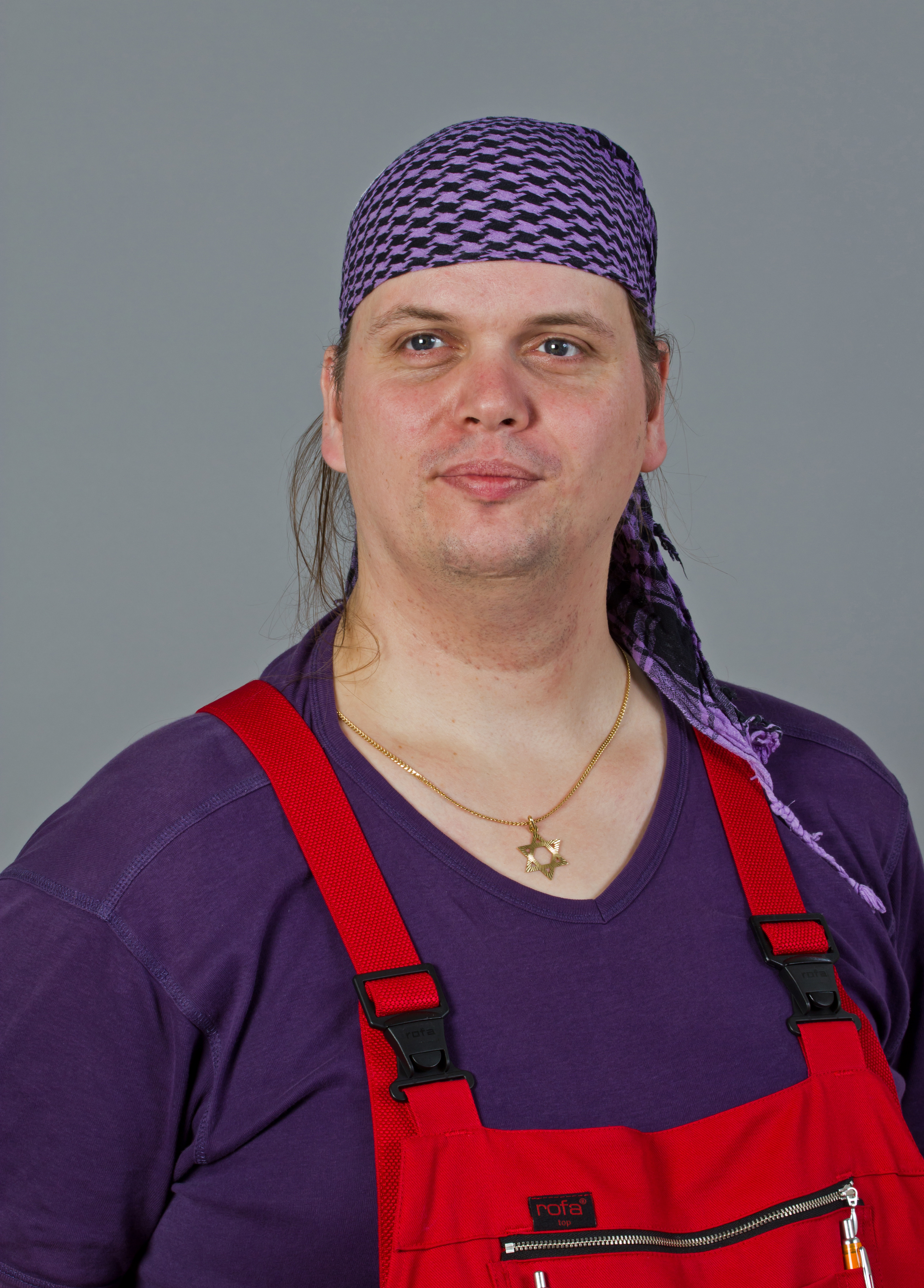

Member of the Berlin House of Representatives
- In office 27 October 2011 – 19 September 2016

Personal details
- Born: 19 May 1972 Dissen am Teutoburger Wald, Germany
- Died: 19 September 2016 (aged 44) Berlin, Germany
- Party: Pirate Party Germany

Gerwald Claus-Brunner (19 May 1972 – 19 September 2016) was a German murderer, politician and member of the Pirate Party Berlin, which is a branch of the national Pirate Party. He entered the state parliament of Berlin when the Pirate party won 15 seats in the 2011 Berlin state election.

== Death ==
Claus-Brunner was found dead on 19 September 2016 along with a 29-year-old man Jan Mirko L. in an apparent murder suicide.

The autopsy came to the result that Claus-Brunner had committed suicide and that the 29-year-old man had been killed days earlier. On 21 September, a parcel service gave an undeliverable parcel to the police; Claus-Brunner had sent it to a former longtime companion. The parcel contained a letter in which Brunner confessed to having killed the man. Brunner had been in love with him; Brunner's final Twitter tweet was a photo of that man.
