= Katharina Nocun =

Polish-German politician and author

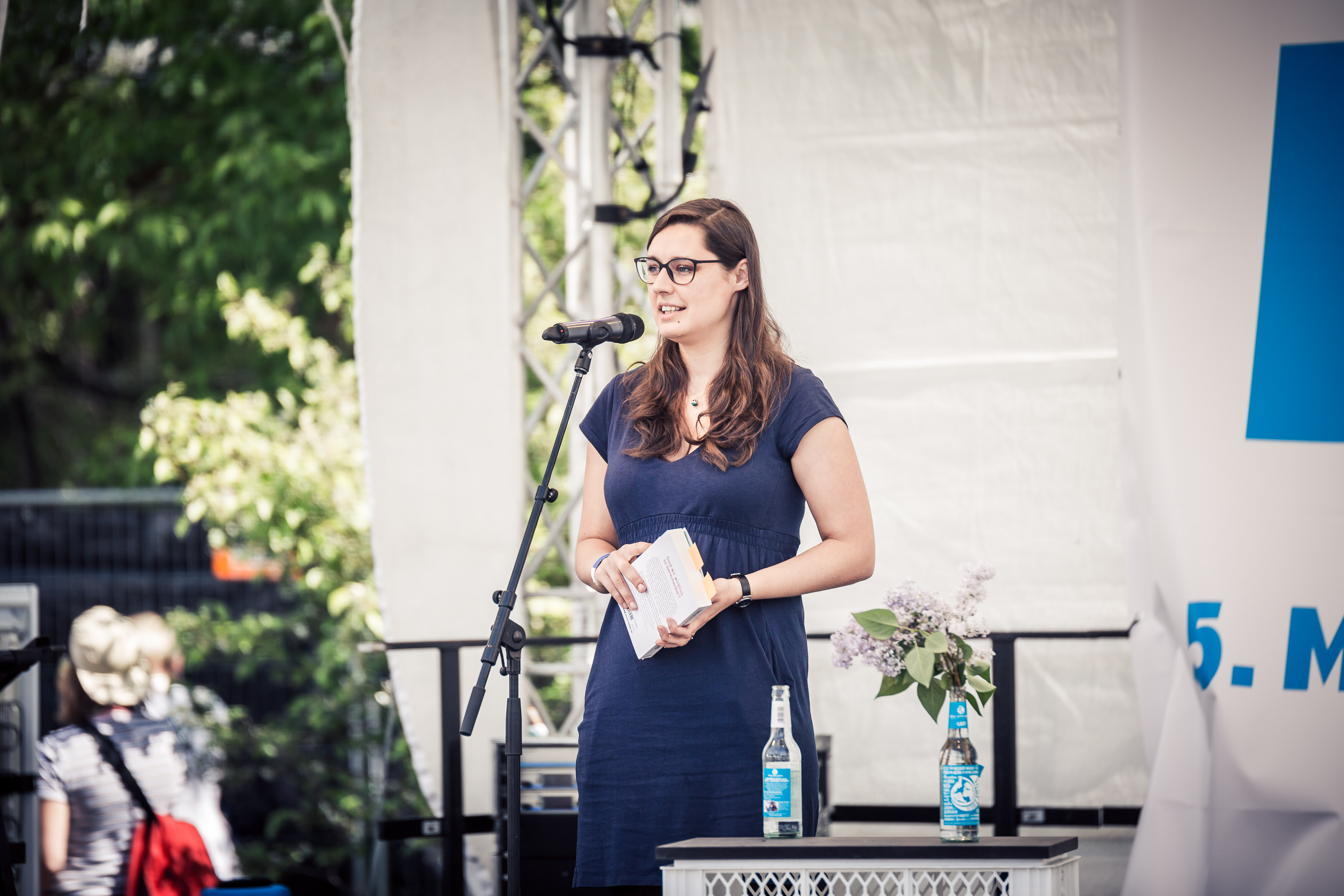
Katharina Nocun (2018)

Katharina Nocun (born 1986 as Katarzyna Nocuń) is a Polish-German politician and author who, from May 2013 to October 2016, has been the policy coordinator of the Pirate Party of Germany.

== Life ==
Nocun was born in Poland in 1986, but grew up in Germany. Her mother is a database administrator, and her father is an IT project manager. After completing the Abitur in Wesel in 2006, she studied Politics and Business at the University of Münster, subsequently studying Politics, Economics and Philosophy at the University of Hamburg. She has a Bachelor of Arts degree. Until December 2012, she worked as an officer for digital consumer rights at the Federation of German Consumer Organizations (Verbraucherzentrale Bundesverband). Currently she is an editor for netzwelt, a technology-related news site, and is completing a part-time degree in business computer science.

Nocun holds both German and Polish nationality.

== Political career ==
Nocun joined the Pirate Party of Germany in March 2012. She was the second candidate on the party list in the 2013 state elections of Lower Saxony, and she ran again as the second candidate on the party list in the 2013 federal election. She is an expert representative for data protection for the Pirate Party of Germany. Since 2010, she has been a part of the independent Workgroup for Data Retention, participated in the 2010/2011 demonstrations for "Freedom Not Fear", and, since 2011, has worked with the Workgroup Census.

On 10 May 2013, she was selected to be the policy coordinator of the Pirate Party of Germany with 81.7 percent of the vote.

On 5 October 2016 Nocun resigned from the Pirate Party of Germany.

== Writing ==
- with Leif-Erik Holtz and Marit Hansen: Towards Displaying Privacy Information with Icons. In: Privacy and Identity Management for Life. Springer Science+Business Media (2011), S. 338–348.
- Die Daten, die ich rief: Wie wir unsere Freiheit an Großkonzerne verkaufen. Bastei Lübbe, Köln 2018, ISBN 3-7857-2620-1.
- with Pia Lamberty (2020), Fake Facts. Wie Verschwörungstheorien unser Denken bestimmen (in German), Köln: Quadriga, ISBN 978-3-86995-095-2
- with Pia Lamberty (2021), True Facts: Was gegen Verschwörungserzählungen wirklich hilft. (in German), Köln: Quadriga, ISBN 978-3-7517-1571-3
- with Pia Lamberty (2022), Gefährlicher Glaube. Die radikale Gedankenwelt der Esoterik (in German), Köln: Quadriga, ISBN 978-3-86995-111-9
