= Weisband =

Weisband is a surname. Notable people with the surname include:

- Bill Weisband (1908–1967), American cryptanalyst and NKVD agent
- Marina Weisband (born 1987), German politician
