= Andreas Baum =

German politician (born 1978)

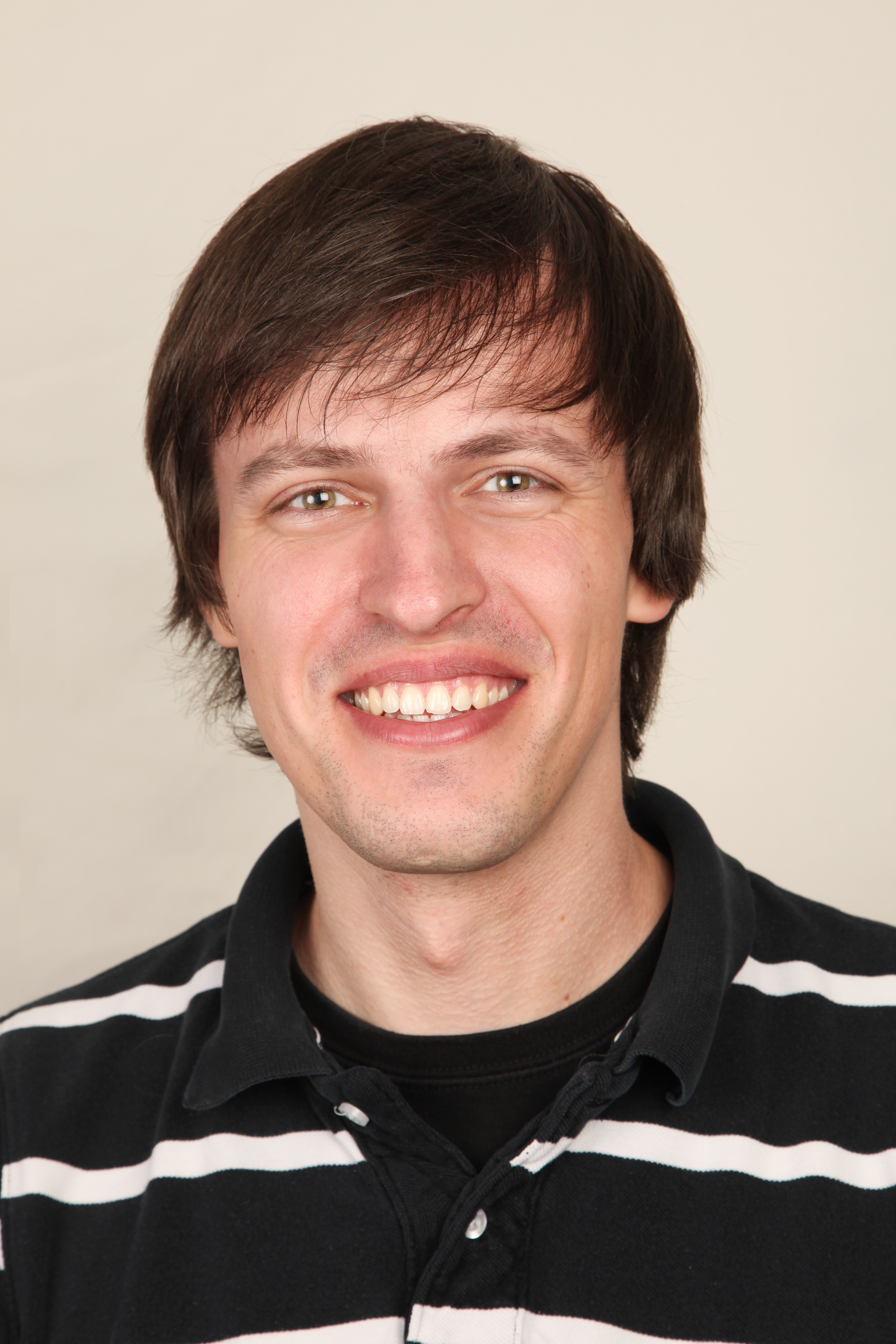

Member of the Berlin House of Representatives
- In office 2011–2016

Personal details
- Born: 5 July 1978 (age 48) Kassel, West Germany
- Party: none

Andreas Baum (born 5 July 1978, in Kassel) is a German politician and former member of the Pirate Party Berlin, which is a branch of the national Pirate Party. He entered the state parliament of Berlin when the Pirate party won 15 seats in the 2011 Berlin state election.
