= Sebastian Nerz =

German politician and bioinformatician

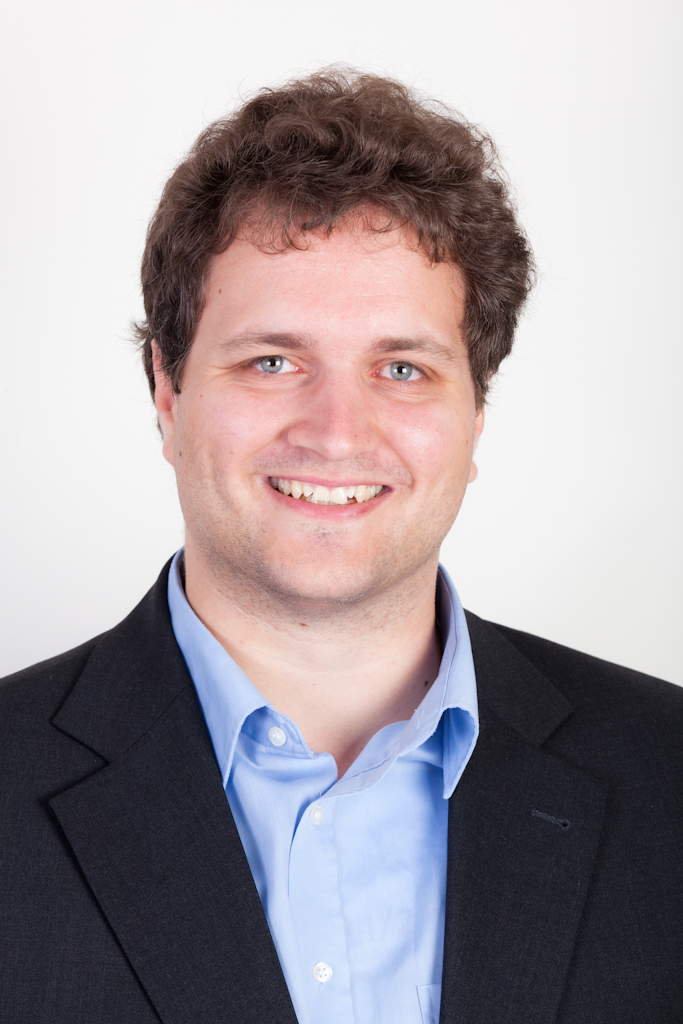

Personal details
- Born: 13 July 1983 (age 43) Reutlingen, Baden-Württemberg, West Germany
- Party: Christian Democratic Union (2001–2009); Pirate Party Germany (2009–2014); Free Democratic Party (2015–)
- Education: University of Tübingen
- Profession: Bioinformatician
- Website: (in German) Personal website

Sebastian Matthias Nerz (born 13 July 1983) is a German politician and bioinformatician who was the leader of the Pirate Party Germany from May 2011 to April 2012. He left the Pirate Party Germany in February 2014.

== Biography ==
Nerz, son of the physicians Rolf-Dieter and Christiane Uta Nerz, née Fiedler, finished his high school education at Geschwister-Scholl-Schule in 2002, and began his studies of bioinformatics at University of Tübingen in 2003 after finishing his mandatory civil service. In 2001 he became a member of the German Christian Democratic Union (CDU) in Tübingen, which he left in 2009. In June 2009 before the German federal election, he joined the Pirate Party, becoming a board member of its then newly founded Tübingen district assembly (German: Bezirksverband Tübingen) as well as coordinator for regional politics in the Baden-Württemberg party association. From April 2010 to May 2011 he was the head of the regional party association. In 2010, he graduated with a diploma in bioinformatics, and was elected the head of the party in May 2011. He was succeeded by Bernd Schlömer on 28 April 2012. Nerz left the Pirate Party Germany in February 2014.
