= Netzwelt =

Coordinates: 53°34′16.43″N 9°52′17.34″E

- Available in: German
- Founded: 1999
- Owner: netzwelt GmbH
- Website: www.netzwelt.de
- Commercial: yes

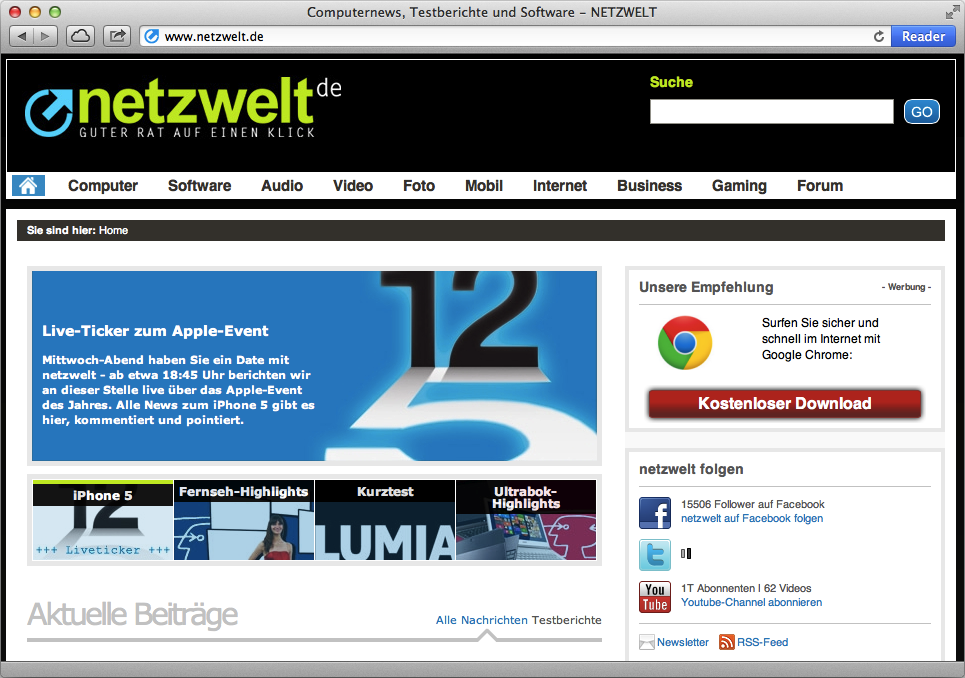
Netzwelt

Netzwelt (own writing: netzwelt) is a technology-related news website run by Netzwelt GmbH. The two founders, Dirk and Sascha Hottes, founded Netzwelt in early 1999 in Darmstadt. The site, which bills itself as "Guter Rat auf einen Klick" (Good advice at a click), features consumer electronics and software, as well as user-generated content in a popular forum. With up to 4,8 million visitors and 18 million page impressions, Netzwelt is one of the top five IT websites in Germany, Austria and Switzerland.

== History ==
The two brothers Sascha and Dirk Hottes have turned their passion into a profession. At the ages of just 20, they created the H² Web GbR in 1999, in Darmstadt. The IT-specialist Dirk Hottes and business economist Sascha Hottes initially created the news portal MP3 World, which dealt primarily with audio software issues. A little later, they gave up their professions, they held as a tax consultant and free advisor to IT companies.

In 2003 the H2 media factory GmbH was founded. Also headquartered in Darmstadt, it took over the operations of H2 Web GbR. In 2008 the company moved to Hamburg, hoping for closer contact with potential investors. In the same year, the H2 media factory GmbH was awarded the regional prize in the competition Hamburger Gründer Champion award (Founders Champion award), organized by the Kreditanstalt für Wiederaufbau (KfW). In August 2011 the H2 media factory GmbH was renamed in netzwelt GmbH.

Some SEO blogs have speculated that the unusual success of netzwelt.de was achieved in part with the support of search engine optimization, since after a sharp rise in the reach within the quarter followed by equally dramatic crashes, which may be explained with a punishment by Google. On a not entirely serious question from medienhandbuch.de in 2008 if they had bribed Google, Sascha Hottes responds: „Of course, our sales is geared primarily towards search engine optimization and online marketing. This is our home, this is our business. We do not need anyone to bribe. To bribe Google is anyway not so easy.“

== Content ==
The range of topics discussed by Netzwelt extends from the introduction of new software to reports about Computer hardware companies, apps, social networks, monitors, smartphones, notebooks, tablets or cameras. In some articles instructions are given with valuable tips for the simple operation of programs. Reviews for computer games are also offered. Altogether, there are nine categories: computers, software, audio, video, photo, mobile, internet, business and gaming. Free programs are discussed and made available for download. In an integrated forum on the page, it is possible to discuss all the issues related to IT and technology, or to get advice when problems arise. Furthermore, a dedicated YouTube channel exists under the name of netzwelt tv, on which the editors give valuable tips, for example how to use smartphones, give reports on what's new to see at fairs or offer interviews with key players of the Internet scene.

== Project Akuma ==
The young entrepreneurs’ talent was proven with the founding of the audio download portal Akuma in 2006. Instead of DRM protection, audio watermarks for each downloaded song were used. With more than a million page views it advanced to one of the most frequently clicked music offerings on the net. In 2010 Akuma was sold to a Berlin-based web agency, focussing on Netzwelt as the core platform for the company behind it. 2012, Akuma is still at the same level as in 2010, which means it has since effectively ended its service.
