= 2011 Berlin state election =

German state election

- 18 September 2011

All 152 seats in the Abgeordnetenhaus of Berlin 77 seats needed for a majority
- Turnout: 1,461,185 (60.2%) ▲2.2%
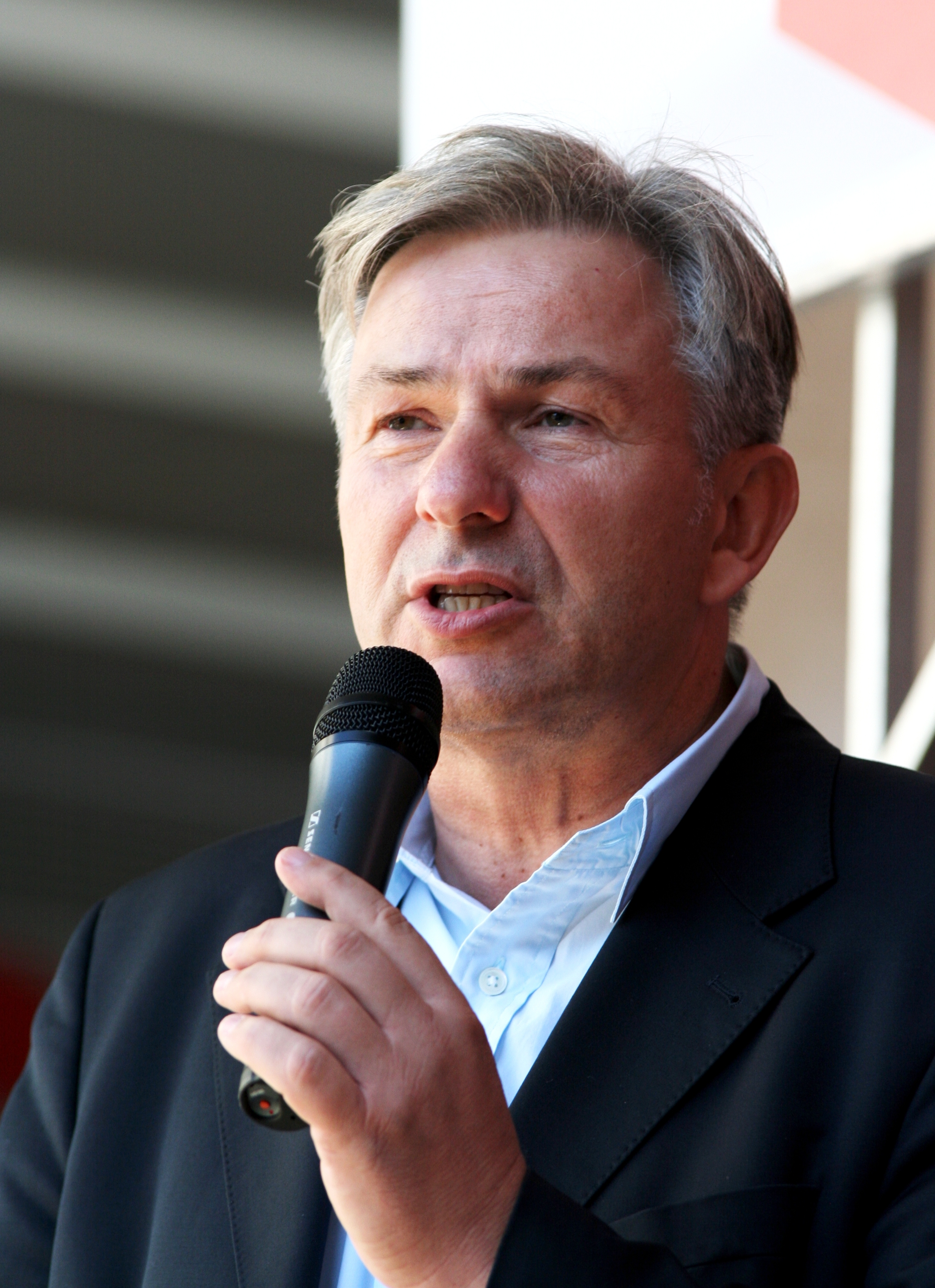

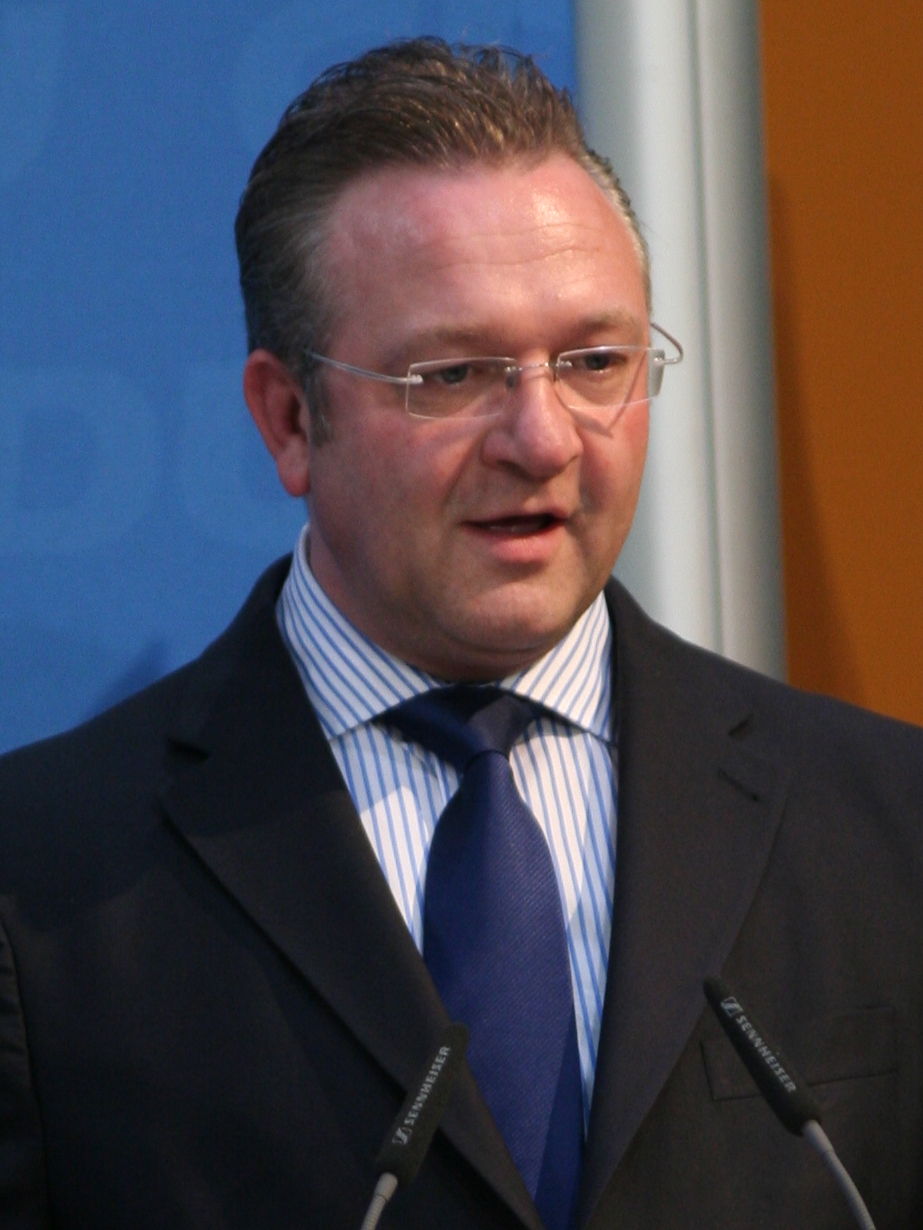

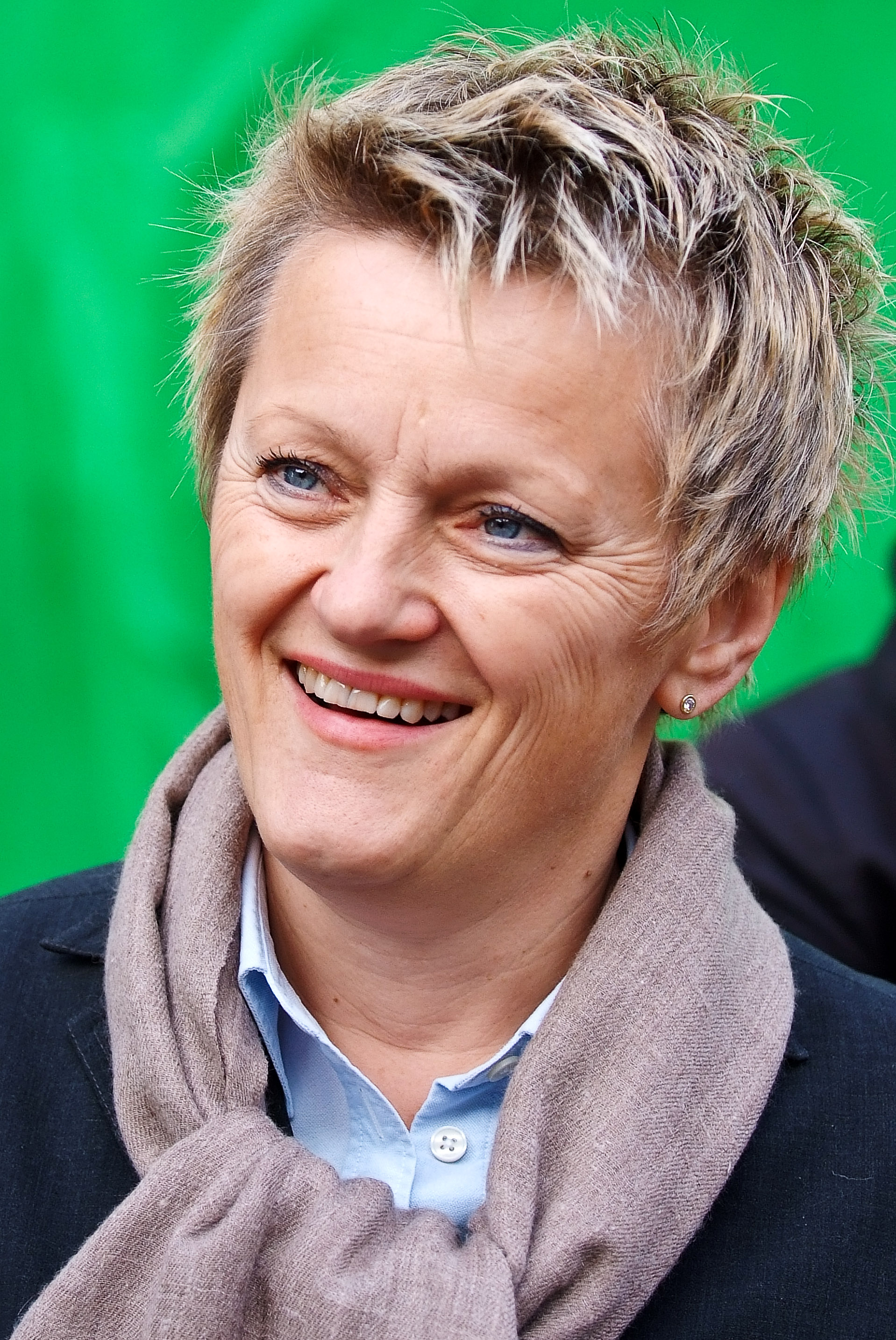

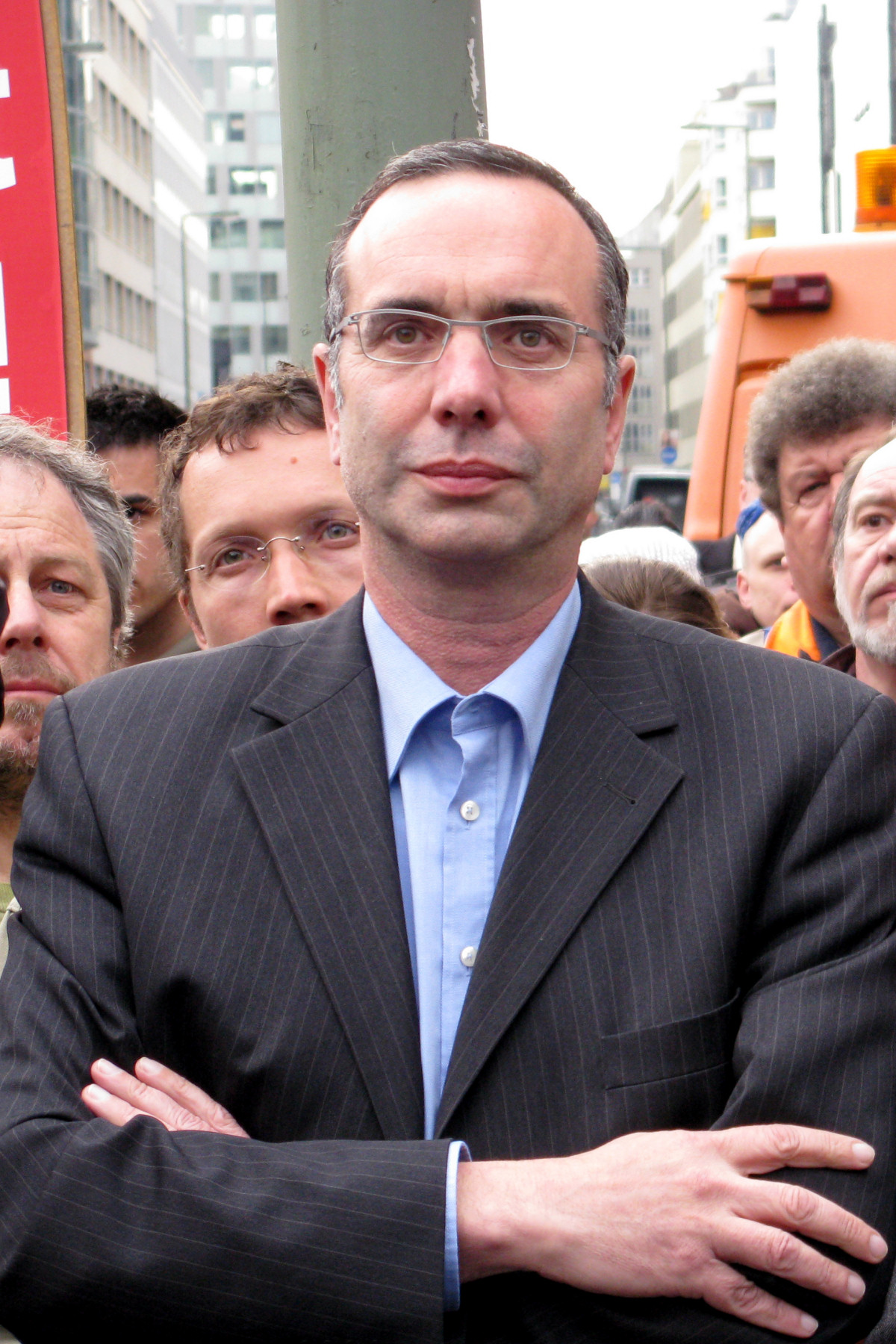

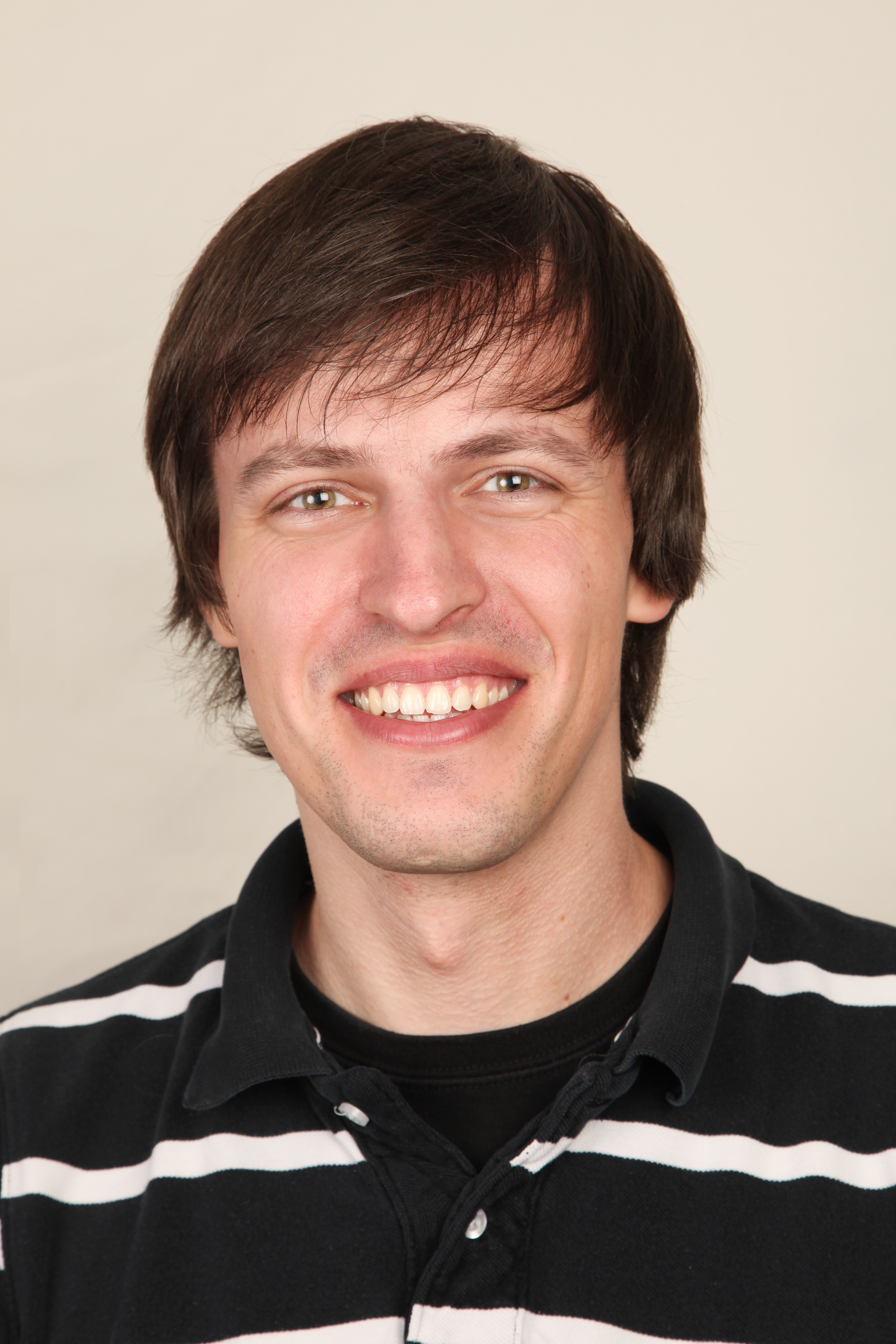

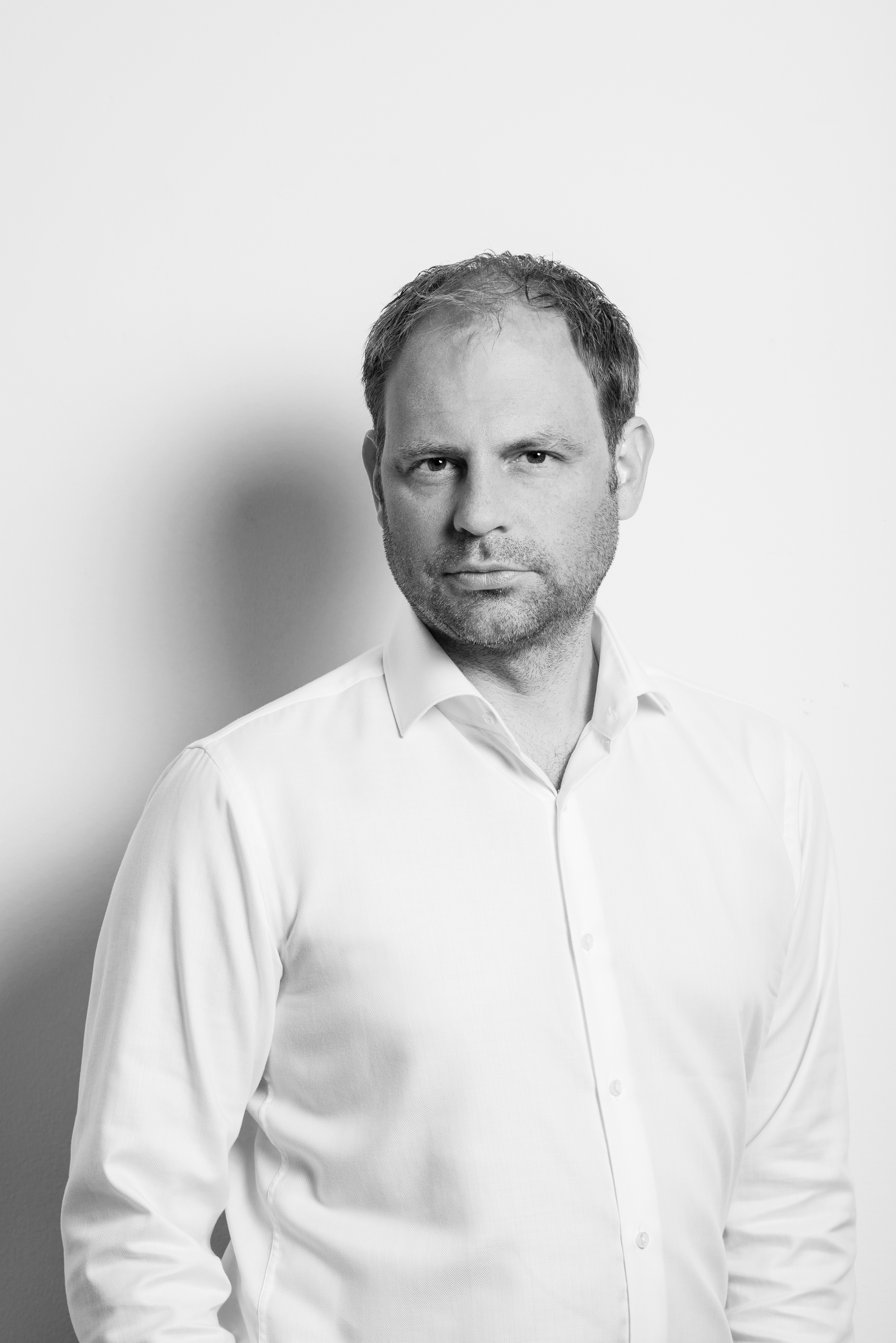
	First party	Second party	Third party
Leader	Klaus Wowereit	Frank Henkel	Renate Künast
Party	SPD	CDU	Greens
Last election	53 seats, 30.8%	37 seats, 21.3%	23 seats, 13.1%
Seats won	48	39	30
Seat change	▼5	▲2	▲7
Popular vote	413,332	341,158	257,063
Percentage	28.3%	23.3%	17.6%
Swing	▼2.5%	▲2.0%	▲4.5%
	Fourth party	Fifth party	Sixth party
Leader	Harald Wolf	Andreas Baum	Christoph Meyer
Party	Left	Pirates	FDP
Last election	23 seats, 16.3% (Note: Results for PDS (13.4%) and WASG (2.9%).)	Did not contest	13 seats, 7.6%
Seats won	20	15	0
Seat change	▼3	▲15	▼13
Popular vote	171,050	130,105	26,943
Percentage	11.6%	8.9%	1.8%
Swing	▼4.6%	▲8.9%	▼5.8%
- Results for single-member constituencies.
Mayor before election
Klaus Wowereit
SPD
Elected Mayor
Klaus Wowereit
SPD

The 2011 Berlin state election was held on 18 September 2011 to elect the members of the 17th Abgeordnetenhaus of Berlin. The incumbent government consisting of the Social Democratic Party (SPD) and The Left lost its majority.

The SPD lost five seats, remaining the largest party, while The Left lost three. The Christian Democratic Union (CDU) made small gains, while The Greens moved into third place with 30 seats. The Free Democratic Party (FDP) lost three-quarters of its votes and all its seats. The Pirate Party contested its first Berlin state election and won fifteen seats with 8.9% of the vote. This was the first time the party had been elected to a state parliament anywhere in Germany.

The SPD initially sought a coalition with The Greens, but talks broke down over the extension of the Bundesautobahn 100. A coalition agreement between the SPD and CDU was finalised in November, with Mayor Klaus Wowereit continuing in office.

== Parties ==
The table below lists parties represented in the 16th Abgeordnetenhaus of Berlin.

Name		Ideology	Leader(s)	2006 result	
Name		Ideology	Leader(s)	Votes (%)	Seats
SPD	Social Democratic Party of Germany; Sozialdemokratische Partei Deutschlands	Social democracy	Klaus Wowereit	30.8%	53 / 149
CDU	Christian Democratic Union of Germany; Christlich Demokratische Union Deutschlands	Christian democracy	Frank Henkel	21.3%	37 / 149
Linke	The Left; Die Linke	Democratic socialism	Harald Wolf	16.3% (Note: Results for PDS (13.4%) and WASG (2.9%).)	23 / 149
Grüne	Alliance 90/The Greens; Bündnis 90/Die Grünen	Green politics	Renate Künast	13.1%	23 / 149
PIRATEN	Pirate Party Germany; Piratenpartei Deutschland	Pirate politics	Andreas Baum	8.9%	15 / 149
FDP	Free Democratic Party; Freie Demokratische Partei	Classical liberalism	Christoph Meyer	7.6%	13 / 149

== Issues and campaign ==
=== Christian Democratic Union ===
The CDU considered safety on the Berlin U-Bahn an issue after a number of attacks on the property of the U-Bahn. The party published material using images from attacks captioned with the question "Safe?" These were later recalled. The CDU also posted billboards comparing the number of police officers cut from the force by the red-red coalition with the number of crimes committed on the city's buses and U-Bahn trains. Nils Diederich, a professor of political science at the Free University of Berlin, stated prior to the election that he did not believe this would be much of an issue due to a positive mood within the city.

=== Social Democratic Party ===
The SPD top candidate and mayor Klaus Wowereit stated, after "well-publicized attacks" in late winter and spring, that he planned to heighten security by increasing the number of police officers by 200 and lengthening the time video surveillance recordings are kept before being erased from 24 to 48 hours.

== Post-election ==
=== Election results and analysis ===
The Free Democratic Party (FDP) representation was removed from the Abgeordnetenhaus of Berlin after they failed to reach the 5% threshold. This was the fifth time in 2011 in Germany that the Free Democrats failed to obtain representation in a state parliament. They also lost representation in Saxony-Anhalt, Rhineland-Palatinate, Bremen and Mecklenburg-Vorpommern. Baden-Württemberg and Hamburg are the only states in which they reached the 5% electoral threshold in that year. The win in Berlin marks the 7th time out of seven elections in 2011 that the Social Democrats got into government.

=== Voting problems ===
On 21 September 2011, election officials found that the results of the Green Party and The Left were inadvertently swapped in the Lichtenberg district. Evrim Baba-Sommer of the Green Party will replace Karin Seidel-Kalmutzki of the Social Democratic Party.

On 22 September 2011, Norbert Kopp, the district mayor for Steglitz-Zehlendorf, confirmed at least 379 postal ballots had found their way into the bin of a block of flats. The ballots were properly sent to the Zehlendorf city hall and the votes could change a number of the local council seats. The police have started an investigation over the incident.

=== Coalition talks ===
Initially, the Social Democrats concentrated on forming a coalition with the Greens. However, on 5 October 2011, coalition talks between the SPD and the Greens broke down. The disagreement was about the extension of Bundesautobahn 100. The Green Party platform had insisted on not extending the Bundesautobahn 100. The Social Democrats offered a compromise to not go ahead with the 3.2 km extension A100 if the €420 million provided by the federal government could be invested in other transportation infrastructure projects. However, the federal government rejected the possibility of transferring the money to other projects. Green Party head Bettina Jarasch stated that "There was not really the will within the SPD to work together with us on a coalition" while the Berliner Zeitung wrote that "the left-wing of the SPD felt Wowereit and Müller had actually wanted to form a coalition with the CDU and had deliberately put the Greens in an impossible situation." Michael Müller, chairman of Berlin chapter of the Social Democratic Party, had "threatened to look towards the CDU" over the past weekend, because the Greens "stuck to their opposition to the motorway extension". Müller pointed out to the Greens "that the Red-Green coalition would only have a one-vote majority compared to the stable 10-vote majority which would be achieved in coalition with the CDU". Wolfgang Thierse, deputy Parliamentary group leader, stated "that he was surprised and a little disappointed at the breakdown of talks" and "Just as Red-Green would not have been heaven for Berlin, Red-Black would not be hell". Renate Künast, leader of the Berlin Chapter of the Green Party, stated that Klaus Wowereit "wanted a surrender, and no coalition".

The Social Democrats therefore continued talks with the Christian Democrats so that a grand coalition that would govern Berlin was finalized on 16 November 2011. According to the 100-page coalition agreement, Wowereit will continue as mayor. Also, each party receives four ministries: Social Democrats will be in charge of the Finance, City development/Environment, Education/Youth/Science, and Jobs/Integration/Women portfolios, whereas the Christian Democrats will have Interior/Sports, Economy/Technology/Research, Health/Social, and Justice/Consumer protection. Disagreements between the two parties have been settled. There will be for example a "City tax" of 5% for hotel guests beginning in 2013 and the minimum wage for public contract jobs will increase by €1 per hour (currently at €7.50). Plans were dropped for making teachers civil servants again and requiring property owners to contribute to street improvement costs. Wowereit summarised the talks by saying "We want Berlin to become richer and to stay sexy".

== Opinion polling ==
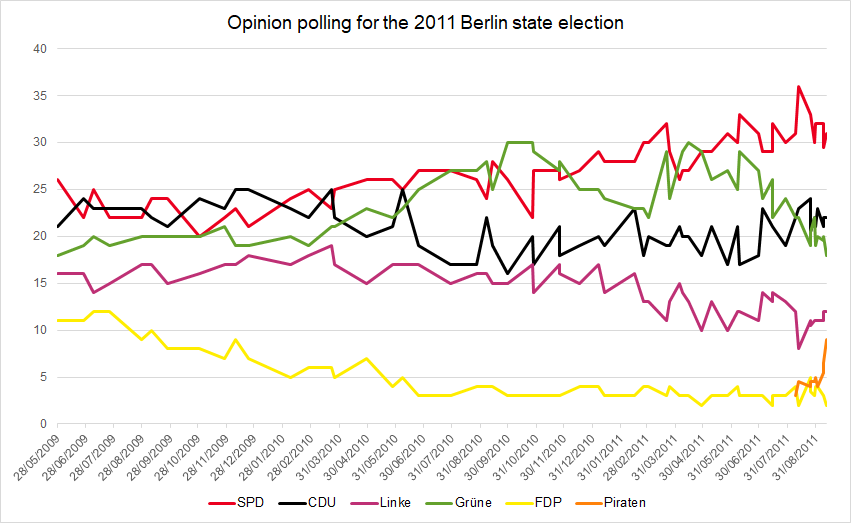

Polling firm	Fieldwork date	Sample size	SPD	CDU	Linke	Grüne	FDP	Piraten	Others	Lead
2011 state election	18 Sep 2011	–	28.3	23.4	11.6	17.6	1.8	8.9	8.3	4.9
INFO GmbH	9–11 Sep 2011	1,504	31	22	12	18	2	9	6	9
Forschungsgruppe Wahlen	5–8 Sep 2011	1,492	32	21	11	19.5	3	5.5	8	11
Infratest dimap	6–8 Sep 2011	1,000	29.5	22	12	20	3	6.5	8	7.5
Emnid	29 Aug – 1 Sep 2011	1,001	32	23	11	20	4	4	6	9
Forsa	5–30 Aug 2011	1,100	32	21	11	19	4	5	8	11
Infratest dimap	26–29 Aug 2011	1,000	30	22	11	22	3	4.5	7.5	8
Emnid	22–25 Aug 2011	576	33	24	11	19	5	4	4	9
Forschungsgruppe Wahlen	22–25 Aug 2011	933	33.0	20.5	10.5	20.5	3.5	4.5	7.5	12.5
INFO GmbH	8–12 Aug 2011	1,047	36	23	8	22	2	4.5	5	13
Infratest dimap	5–8 Aug 2011	1,000	31	22	12	22	4	3	6	9
Forsa	18–28 Jul 2011	1,003	30	19	13	24	3	–	11	6
INFO GmbH	11–14 Jul 2011	1,042	29	21	13	26	2	–	9	3
Emnid	6–14 Jul 2011	1,002	32	21	14	22	3	–	8	10
Infratest dimap	1–4 Jul 2011	1,000	29	23	14	24	3	2	5	5
Forsa	20–29 Jun 2011	1,001	31	18	11	27	3	–	10	4
INFO GmbH	6–8 Jun 2011	1,002	33	17	12	29	3	–	6	4
Infratest dimap	3–6 Jun 2011	1,000	30	21	12	25	4	–	8	5
Forsa	18–26 May 2011	1,005	31	17	10	27	3	–	12	4
INFO GmbH	May 2011	1,000	28	20	11	31	2	–	7	3
Infratest dimap	6–9 May 2011	1,003	29	21	13	26	3	–	8	3
Forsa	18–28 Apr 2011	1,004	29	18	10	29	2	–	12	Tie
INFO GmbH	8–14 Apr 2011	1,043	27	20	13	30	3	–	?	3
Emnid	6–7 Apr 2011	1,000	27	20	14	29	3	–	7	2
Infratest dimap	1–4 Apr 2011	1,000	26	21	15	28	3	–	7	2
INFO GmbH	16–21 Mar 2011	1,002	32	19	11	29	3	–	?	3
Forsa	14–24 Mar 2011	1,001	29	19	13	24	4	–	12	5
INFO GmbH	18 Feb – 1 Mar 2011	1,018	30	20	13	22	4	–	11.7	8
Forsa	15–24 Feb 2011	1,006	30	18	13	23	4	–	12	7
Infratest dimap	11–14 Feb 2011	1,000	28	23	16	23	3	–	7	5
Forsa	5–13 Jan 2011	1,001	28	19	14	24	3	–	12	4
Infratest dimap	5–6 Jan 2011	1,000	29	20	17	25	4	–	5	4
Forsa	7–16 Dec 2010	1,004	27	19	15	25	4	–	10	2
Forsa	16–25 Nov 2010	1,002	27	21	17	27	3	–	5	Tie
Forsa	16–25 Nov 2010	1,002	26	18	16	28	3	–	9	2
Forsa	19–28 Oct 2010	1,004	27	17	14	29	3	–	10	2
Infratest dimap	25–26 Oct 2010	1,000	22	20	17	30	3	–	8	8
Forsa	21–29 Sep 2010	1,006	26	16	15	30	3	–	10	4
Emnid	13 Sep 2010	?	28	19	15	25	4	–	9	3
Infratest dimap	3–6 Sep 2010	1,000	24	22	16	28	4	–	6	4
Forsa	17–26 Aug 2010	1,001	26	17	16	27	4	–	10	1
Forsa	19–29 Jul 2010	1,005	27	17	15	27	4	–	10	Tie
Forsa	17–24 Jun 2010	1,001	27	19	17	25	3	–	9	8
Infratest dimap	4–7 Jun 2010	1,001	25	25	17	23	5	–	5	Tie
Forsa	18–27 May 2010	1,003	26	21	17	22	4	–	10	5
Forsa	19–29 Apr 2010	1,006	26	20	15	23	7	–	9	6
Forsa	15–25 Mar 2010	1,003	25	22	17	21	5	–	10	3
Infratest dimap	19–22 Mar 2010	1,000	23	25	19	21	6	–	6	2
Forsa	12–25 Feb 2010	1,001	25	22	18	19	6	–	10	3
Forsa	25 Jan – 5 Feb 2010	1,005	24	23	17	20	5	–	11	1
Forsa	14–22 Dec 2009	1,005	21	25	18	19	7	–	10	4
Infratest dimap	4–7 Dec 2009	1,000	23	25	17	19	9	–	5	2
Forsa	19–26 Nov 2009	1,002	22	23	17	21	7	–	10	1
Forsa	26–29 Oct 2009	1,004	20	24	16	20	8	–	12	4
Forsa	15–24 Sep 2009	1,007	24	21	15	20	8	–	12	3
Infratest dimap	4–7 Sep 2009	1,000	24	22	16	20	10	–	8	2
Forsa	19–27 Aug 2009	1,005	22	23	16	20	9	–	10	1
Forsa	14–23 Jul 2009	1,003	22	23	15	19	12	–	9	1
Infratest dimap	2–6 Jul 2009	1,000	25	23	14	20	12	–	6	2
Forsa	16–25 Jun 2009	1,007	22	24	16	19	11	–	8	2
Forsa	18–28 May 2009	1,007	26	21	16	18	11	–	8	5
Forsa	20–27 Apr 2009	1,000	27	21	16	16	11	–	9	6
Infratest dimap	6–9 Apr 2009	2,500	29	22	15	17	11	–	6	7
Forsa	16–26 Mar 2009	1,004	29	20	14	18	12	–	7	9
Forsa	3 March 2009	1,001	27	21	15	16	14	–	7	6
Forsa	Jan 2009	1,005	28	23	15	17	10	–	7	5
Forsa	29 Dec 2008	?	28	20	17	16	11	–	8	8
Infratest dimap	4–8 Dec 2008	1,000	28	24	16	17	9	–	6	4
Forsa	17–27 Nov 2008	1,006	26	20	19	17	9	–	9	6
Forsa	20–30 Oct 2008	1,003	27	22	19	15	8	–	9	5
Forsa	29 Sep 2008	1,002	28	18	18	17	10	–	9	10
Infratest dimap	4–8 Sep 2008	1,000	29	21	16	18	9	–	7	8
Forsa	18–28 Aug 2008	1,008	27	21	18	16	9	–	?	6
Forsa	14–24 Jul 2008	1,001	26	20	20	17	8	–	9	6
Forsa	16–26 Jun 2008	1,000	28	21	18	15	9	–	?	7
Infratest dimap	6–9 Jun 2008	1,000	27	23	18	18	9	–	5	4
Forsa	19–29 May 2008	1,000	27	23	18	15	8	–	9	4
Forsa	14–24 Apr 2008	1,204	28	23	16	16	8	–	9	5
Infratest dimap	11–16 Apr 2008	2,500	29	25	17	16	7	–	6	4
Forsa	13–27 Mar 2008	1,000	26	23	16	16	8	–	11	3
Infratest dimap	7–10 Mar 2008	1,000	29	23	18	16	7	–	7	6
Forsa	18–28 Feb 2008	1,000	28	22	16	14	8	–	12	6
Forsa	14–24 Jan 2008	1,000	28	25	15	15	7	–	10	3
Forsa	11–20 Dec 2007	1,002	28	23	16	14	7	–	12	5
Infratest dimap	7–10 Dec 2007	1,000	31	23	15	16	7	–	8	8
Forsa	5–15 Nov 2007	1,000	30	22	15	15	7	–	11	8
Infratest dimap	9–12 Nov 2007	1,000	31	25	16	16	5	–	7	6
Forsa	8–18 Oct 2007	1,003	28	22	15	14	9	–	12	6
Infratest dimap	5–8 Oct 2007	1,000	33	25	14	14	6	–	8	8
Forsa	11–20 Sep 2007	1,001	26	24	17	13	8	–	12	2
Infratest dimap	7–9 Sep 2007	1,000	31	24	16	16	5	–	8	7
Forsa	13–23 Aug 2007	1,002	28	22	16	15	6	–	13	6
Forsa	16–26 Jul 2007	1,001	26	24	15	14	7	–	14	2
Infratest dimap	29 Jun – 2 Jul 2007	1,000	31	24	16	15	7	–	7	7
Forsa	18–28 Jun 2007	1,001	24	22	17	15	8	–	14	2
Infratest dimap	1–4 Jun 2007	1,000	30	23	15	17	7	–	8	7
Forsa	21–24 May 2007	1,005	27	21	13	17	8	–	14	6
Infratest dimap	27–29 Apr 2007	1,000	32	21	15	16	8	–	8	11
Forsa	18–26 Apr 2007	1,001	25	22	14	17	8	–	14	3
Infratest dimap	30 Mar – 2 Apr 2007	1,000	33	22	13	15	8	–	9	11
Forsa	5–15 Mar 2007	1,001	26	20	13	17	8	–	16	6
Infratest dimap	2–5 Mar 2007	1,000	31	22	13	16	8	–	10	9
Forsa	12–15 Feb 2007	1,000	28	19	13	16	8	–	16	9
Infratest dimap	2–5 Feb 2007	1,000	33	21	14	14	8	–	10	12
Forsa	8–18 Jan 2007	1,000	30	19	12	15	8	–	16	11
Forsa	11–21 Dec 2006	1,001	29	17	15	16	8	–	15	12
Forsa	13–23 Nov 2006	1,014	28	19	14	14	9	–	16	8
Forsa	9–19 Oct 2006	1,001	28	20	13	15	8	–	16	8
2006 state election	17 Sep 2006	–	30.8	21.3	13.4	13.1	7.6	–	13.8	9.5

== Election result ==
Summary of 18 September 2011 election results for the Abgeordnetenhaus of Berlin
Party	Votes	%	+/-	Seats	+/-	Seats %
Social Democratic Party (SPD)	413,332	28.3	▼2.5	48	▼5	31.6
Christian Democratic Union (CDU)	341,158	23.4	▲2.1	39	▲2	25.7
Alliance 90/The Greens (Grüne)	257,063	17.6	▲4.5	30	▲7	19.7
The Left (Linke)	171,050	11.6	▼4.6	20	▼3	13.2
Pirate Party Germany (Piraten)	130,105	8.9	New	15	New	9.9
National Democratic Party (NPD)	31,241	2.1	▼0.4	0	±0	0
Free Democratic Party (FDP)	26,943	1.8	▼5.8	0	▼13	0
Human Environment Animal Protection Party	21,612	1.5	▲0.6	0	±0	0
Pro Germany Citizens' Movement	17,829	1.2	New	0	New	0
Others	50,732	3.5		0	±0	0
Total	1,461,185	100.0		152	▲3	
Voter turnout		60.2	▲2.2			

Popular Vote
SPD	28.29%
CDU	23.35%
B'90/GRÜNE	17.59%
DIE LINKE	11.71%
PIRATEN	8.90%
FDP	1.84%
Other	8.32%

Abgeordnetenhaus seats
SPD	31.57%
CDU	25.66%
B'90/GRÜNE	19.74%
DIE LINKE	13.16%
PIRATEN	9.87%

	SPD	CDU/CSU	Linke	Grüne	FDP	Others	Pirates	NPD
West Berlin	27.9	29.5	4.3	20.3	2.3	9.9	8.1	1.6
East Berlin	28.8	14.2	22.7	13.5	1.2	10.7	10.1	2.9
