= Bernd Schlömer =

German politician (born 1971)

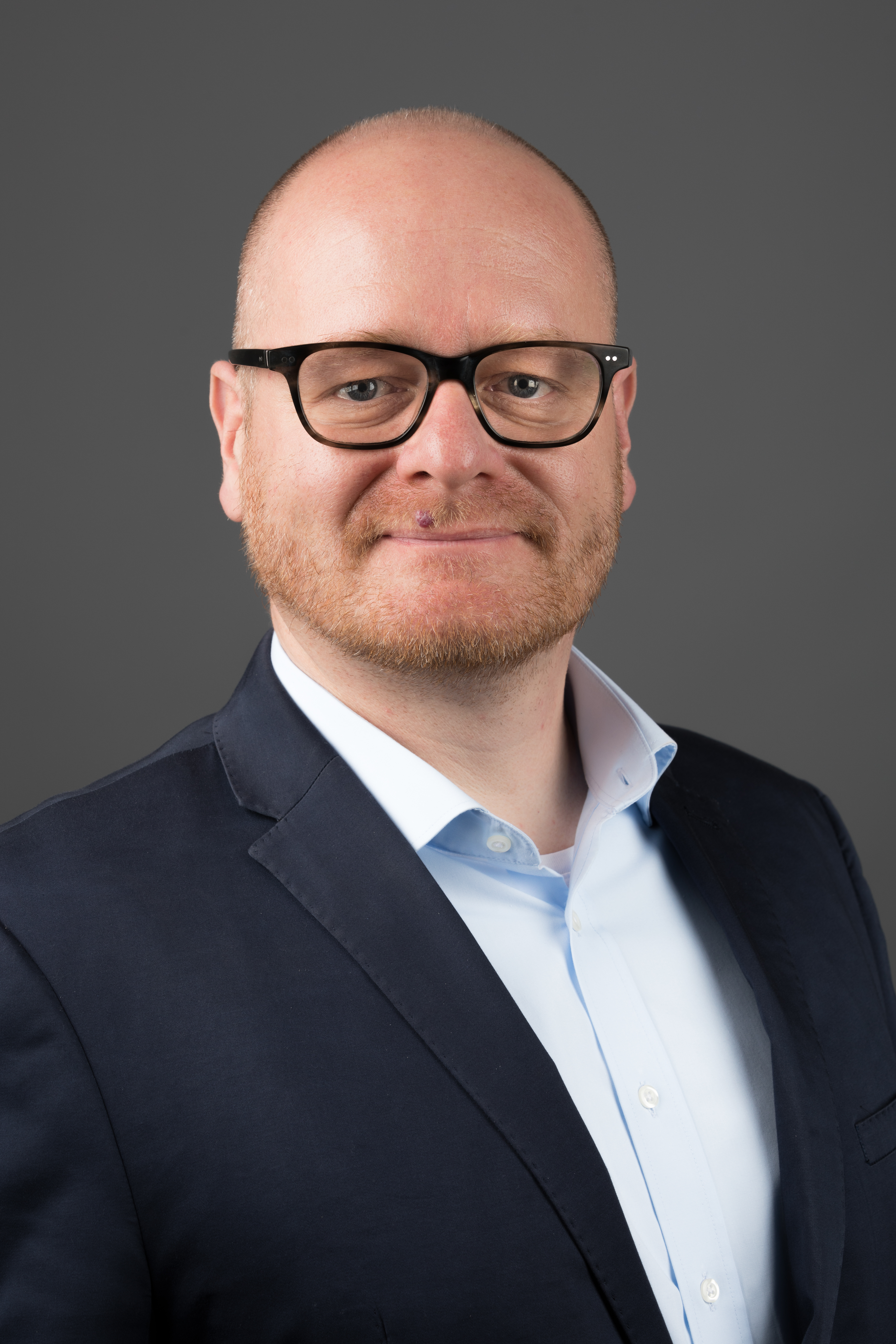
- Schlömer in 2017

Member of the Abgeordnetenhaus of Berlin
- In office 27 October 2016 – 4 November 2021
- Constituency: Friedrichshain-Kreuzberg

Personal details
- Born: 20 February 1971 (age 55) Meppen
- Party: Free Democratic Party (since 2015)

Bernd Schlömer (born 20 February 1971 in Meppen) is a German politician serving as state secretary of digitalization of Saxony-Anhalt since 2021. From 2016 to 2021, he was a member of the Abgeordnetenhaus of Berlin. From 2012 to 2013, he served as chairman of the Pirate Party.
