= Pirate Party Germany =

Political party in Germany

Pirate Party Germany Piratenpartei Deutschland
- Leader: Lilia Kayra Kuyumcu (de)
- Founded: 10 September 2006; 20 years ago
- Headquarters: Berlin
- Youth wing: Young Pirates
- Membership (25 September 2026): ▼4,057
- Ideology: Pirate politics E-democracy; Direct democracy Social liberalism Anti-corruption
- European Parliament group: Greens/EFA
- International affiliation: Pirate Parties International
- European political alliance: European Pirate Party
- Colours: Orange Black White
- Bundestag: 0 / 630
- European Parliament: 0 / 96
- State Parliaments: 0 / 1,821

Website
- piratenpartei.de

The Pirate Party Germany (German: Piratenpartei Deutschland), commonly known as Pirates (German: Piraten), is a political party in Germany founded in September 2006 at c-base. It states general agreement with the Swedish Piratpartiet as a party of the information society; it is part of the international movement of pirate parties and a member of the Pirate Parties International.

In 2011 and 2012, fuelled by overlapping support from the international Occupy Movement, the party succeeded in attaining a high enough vote share to enter four state parliaments (Berlin, North Rhine-Westphalia, Saarland and Schleswig-Holstein) and the European Parliament. However, their popularity rapidly declined thereafter; by 2017, the Pirate Party had no representation in any of the German state parliaments. Their European Parliament members, Felix Reda (2014-2019) and his successor, Patrick Breyer (2019-2024), were in the European Pirate Party (founded 21 March 2014), which, in turn, is in the Greens–European Free Alliance group. Together with Marcel Kolaja, Markéta Gregorová and Mikuláš Peksa from the Czech Pirate Party, Breyer built up the European Pirate Party's team for the European Parliament in Brussels.

According to political theorist Oskar Niedermayer, the party sees itself as part of an international movement to shape with their term of "digital revolution" which is a circumscription for the transition into information society. With their focus on freedom in the net and their fight against government regulations of this sphere, they caught the attention especially of the younger generation. Even if the network policy is the core identity of the party, it is now more than just an advocacy party of "digital natives" and characterises itself as social-liberal-progressive.

Former federal chairman Sebastian Nerz sees the party as a social-liberal party of fundamental rights which, among other things, wants to advocate for political transparency.

== Party platform ==
The party supports the preservation of current civil rights in telephony and on the Internet; in particular, it opposes the European data retention policies.

The party favors the civil right to information privacy and reforms of copyright, education, genetic patents and drug policy.

In particular, it promotes an enhanced transparency of government by implementing open source governance and providing for APIs to allow for electronic inspection and monitoring of government operations by the citizen.

The Pirate Party also supports an unconditional basic income (UBI) for citizens and direct democracy via e-democracy.

== History ==
=== Foundation ===
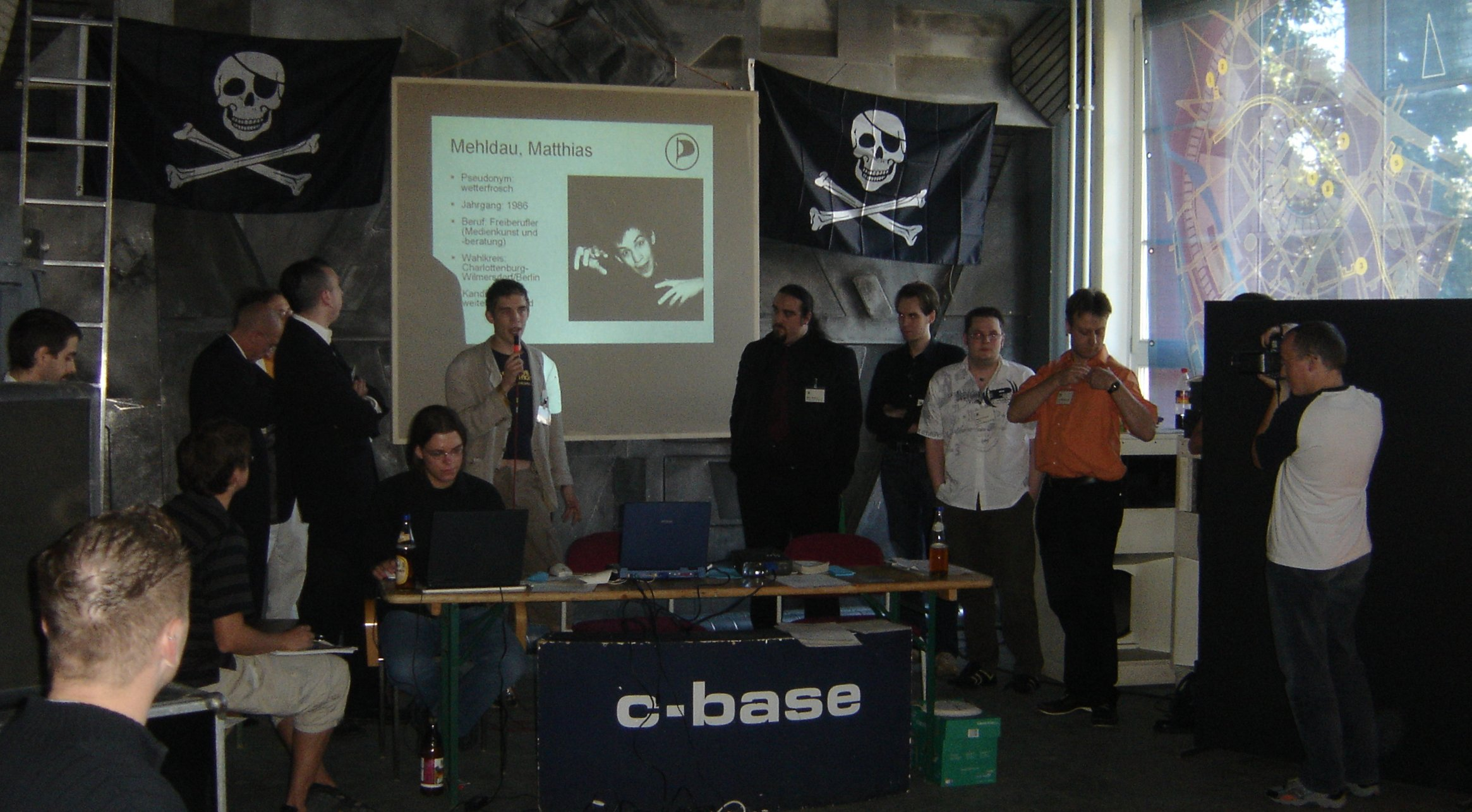
Inaugural meeting in 2006, at the c-base in Berlin (presentation of the board candidates)

The party was founded on 10 September 2006 by students and young people inspired by the recently founded Swedish Pirate Party.

=== Rise ===
In June 2009, Bundestag member Jörg Tauss left the SPD and joined the Pirate Party after the Zugangserschwerungsgesetz was passed, but left the Pirate Party in 2010 when he was convicted for possession of child pornography. In late August 2009, Herbert Rusche, one of the founding members of the German Green Party and, in the 1980s, the first openly gay member of parliament in Germany, joined the Pirate Party.

The party first began to contest elections in 2009; firstly in the 2009 European Parliament election in Germany and then the 2009 German federal election. Although the party received no seats in either election, the pirates performed well in the Federal election, obtaining 1.95% of the vote. This was the best showing of any party without any national representation. Budding support for the party was galvanised by activism against online censorship laws introduced in Germany that year. The result impressed journalists, who began speculating that the Pirates could have the same trajectory as the Green Party, beginning as a single-issue protest party before transforming into a deeper organisation.

==== Breakthrough ====
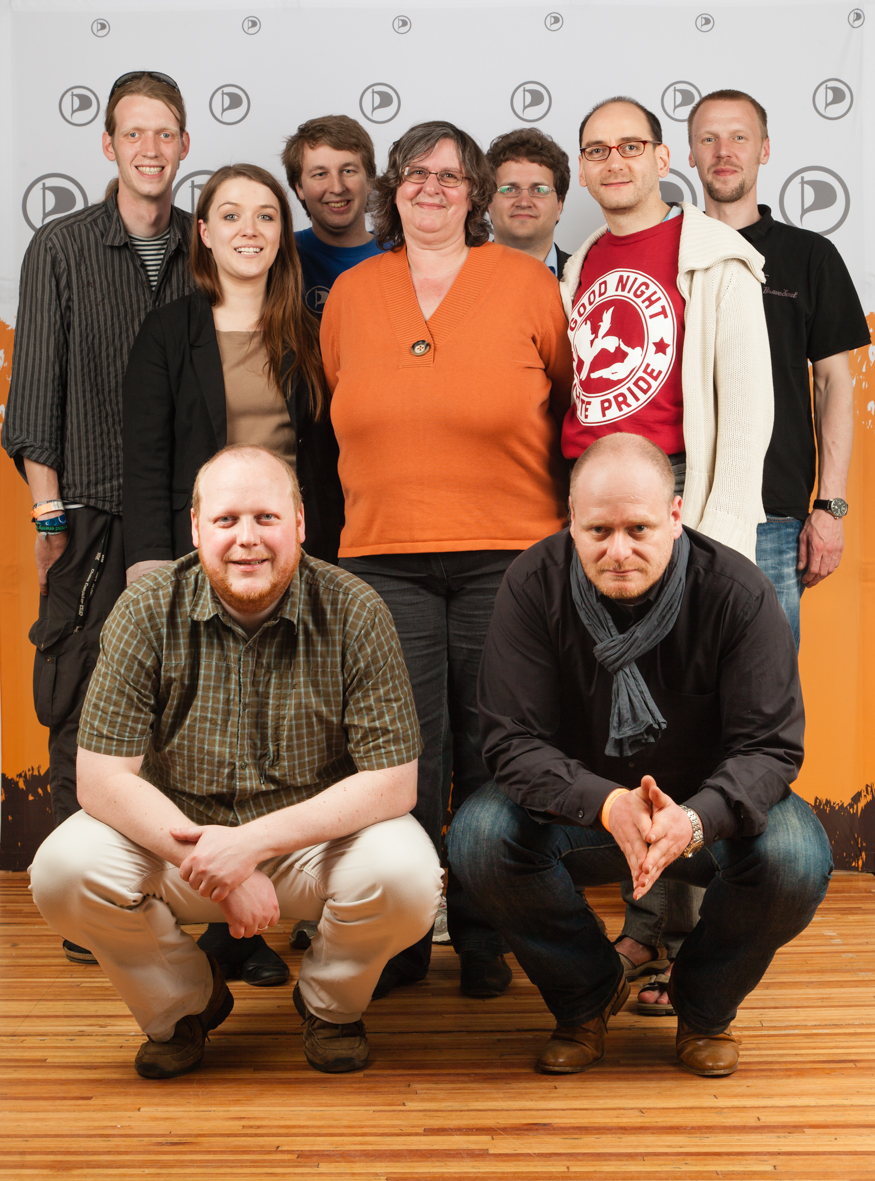
Members of the Pirate Party's Federal Board in 2012

The party's first major electoral success came at the 2011 Berlin state election, when the party entered a state parliament for the first time after the Berlin party chapter received 8.9 per cent of the votes for the state parliament of Berlin and all 15 of its candidates were elected. The results shocked even the party itself and a wave of euphoria washed over the membership. The election in Berlin, held in September, had coincided with the start of the international Occupy Movement, and many journalists attributed the same sentiment fueling the Occupy Movement as also providing support for Pirate Parties internationally.

In the Spring of 2012, the Pirates won seats in three other German federal states and by August 2012 the party had around 35,000 members. National polling showed surging support for the party with the Irish Times referring to the Pirates as "the third most popular party in Germany" following a poll by Stern magazine which placed the party on 13% national support.

This would functionally be the high watermark for the party, which subsequently went into a steady decline and was never able to recover from it.

=== Fall ===
History of membership

In October 2012, Der Spiegel published an article titled "Voters Growing Disillusioned with Germany's Pirate Party". The article noted the now declining support for the party and outlined several probable reasons for this. Amongst flaws in the party Der Spiegel suggested were:

- Many Pirate politicians were political amateurs and struggled to find their footing once elected.
- The party's left-libertarian and anti-authoritarian nature made it difficult for strong leadership to be established.
- The bohemian and eccentric nature of Pirate Party politicians made it difficult for them to function as one unit. Infighting was common, as were publicity stunts which often backfired.
- The lack of cohesion in pirate ideology meant that outside of issues relating to the internet, Pirate Party politicians struggled to form coherent policy positions.

A 2016 article entitled "The Rise and Fall of the Pirate Party" in The New Republic echoed the above sentiments but also quoted the thoughts of one party activist, who stated "[o]ur biggest problem was that we let everyone in who wanted to join, and most of them were apolitical. They weren’t interested in politics. I couldn’t take it anymore. Every political opinion was tolerated. I’d go to a Party convention and there would be, like, Holocaust deniers there."

The party floundered at the 2013 Lower Saxony state election in January as well as the 2013 Bavarian state election in September, each time only securing 2% of the vote, not enough to break Germany's 5% threshold for political parties to gain seats. These results foreshadowed the party's poor performance at the 2013 German federal election. Der Spiegel opined in a September 2013 article that the Pirate Party could have thrived in the 2013 Federal election if it was more organised; a major issue during the campaign was the topic of spying, following revelations over the summer that the American National Security Agency was conducting large scale spying operations in Germany and France.

The party was unable to right the ship by the time of the 2016 Berlin state election; the party secured only a 1.7% share of the vote and lost all 15 of its seats in what had previously been its stronghold. The sense of terminal decline was compounded days after the result when Gerwald Claus-Brunner, an assembly member who had just lost his seat, murdered a former intern before killing himself.

Following the Berlin wipeout, many declared the Pirate Party a dead political project; former party leader Martin Delius and former party Chairman Christopher Lauer left the party and publicly expressed that they did not wish to see it continue.

In late 2018, just over two years after the Claus-Brunner scandal, the party was rocked by a sexual harassment scandal, with Gilles Bordelais, one of its candidates for the European elections, at its centre. Bordelais was an employee of the party's MEP Felix Reda and was placed under investigation for sexual harassment of European Parliament employees. Despite the fact that Reda had provided timely notification to the party's Board, the Board failed to act on the information provided, keeping him on the ballot. This prompted Reda to resign from the party and politics in general, announcing his decision on 27 March 2019, in an online video protesting the party's inaction on the matter. Following Reda's resignation and withdrawal, the party continued its electoral decline at the local, state, federal, and European level.

In recent years, the party has come under heavy criticism from other Pirate parties and prominent figures of the global Pirate movement for its handling of various issues and controversies, and its stance on international topics like the Gaza genocide and the Israeli occupation of the West Bank, with Andrew Norton, Birgitta Jónsdóttir, the Pirate Party of Greece, and the United States Pirate Party being especially vocal.

The 2025 German federal election marked its terminal decline, as it received only 0.03% of the national vote (13,800 total voters), losing 91.86% of the votes it attracted in the 2021 federal election.

=== 2009 federal election ===
On 27 September 2009, the Pirates received 1.95% (845,870 votes) in the 2009 German federal election, thus not securing any seats in the Bundestag. However, this was still the best result among parties that did not meet the 5% threshold. Among first-time male voters, the party received 13%.

On account of the election results in 2009, the party met the conditions for receiving public allowances, a status it lost in 2024. For 2009, it received €31,504.68 (the same amount as it received from private contributions) which was exclusively due to the Pirates state associations Saxony and Schleswig-Holstein. The calculation was made based on the total receipts of the party in 2008. The possible upper limit of the public allowance matching for the party is a rate of €840,554.51.

=== 2009 European Parliament election ===
Election results in the 2009 European Parliament election

It received 229,117 votes in the 2009 European Parliament election, which was 0.9%, but not enough for a seat.

=== State and regional elections ===
On 30 August 2009, the Pirates received 1.9% in the 2009 Saxony state election. On the same day, the party also received one seat in each council in the local elections of Münster and Aachen, although candidates of the party ran for office only in some constituencies of both cities.

Support for The Pirates differs somewhat between States. The party received 1.8% in the 2009 Schleswig-Holstein state election and 1.5% in the 2010 North Rhine-Westphalia state election (though without securing seats), but only 0.5% in the 2009 Hesse state election and did not participate in the 2009 Brandenburg and Saarland state elections.

The party received 2.1% in the 2011 Hamburg state elections, though it was not yet enough to gain seats in the State parliament. In the 2011 Baden-Württemberg state election the Pirate Party was able to repeat this result. In the 2011 Saxony-Anhalt state election they received 1.4% or 13,828 votes; in the 2011 Rhineland-Palatinate state election they achieved 1.6% of the votes.

Results for the Pirate Party in the 2011 Berlin state election. Left: results for direct mandates. Top right: results by borough.

In the 2011 Berlin state election, with 8.9% of the votes the Pirate Party of Berlin managed for the first time to overcome the 5% threshold and to win seats (numbering 15 out of 141 seats in the Abgeordnetenhaus) in a German state parliament. This was quite a surprise for them, since they only had 15 candidates on the ballot. In response to their election, however, Mayor Klaus Wowereit criticized their lack of diversity, most notably the lack of women in the party.

In March 2012, the Pirates received 7.4% of the vote and thus won four seats in the Landtag of Saarland.

In May 2012, they won 8.2% of the vote in Schleswig-Holstein, which was sufficient to enter the state parliament, gaining six seats, being led by Torge Schmidt from 2013 until 2017. Also in May 2012, they won 7.8% of the vote in North Rhine-Westphalia, gaining 20 seats.

=== 2013 federal election ===
After those successful state elections, the party was able to score up to 13% in nationwide polls. However, after a string of scandals and internal disputes which were handled unprofessionally and picked up by the media, the party lost the trust of voters and entered a steady decline in polls, from which it never recovered.

As a result, in the Lower Saxony state election in January 2013, the Pirate Party was only able to gain about 2.1% of the votes, missing the 5% threshold needed to gain actual seats in the state parliament. Six months later during the Bavaria state election of 2013 the Pirates fared similarly, receiving again only 2% of the votes. At the 2013 German federal elections the following weekend, the party suffered another major defeat where it was again only able to achieve 2.2% of the votes, leading to the resignation of party leader Bernd Schlömer.

=== 2014 European Parliament election ===
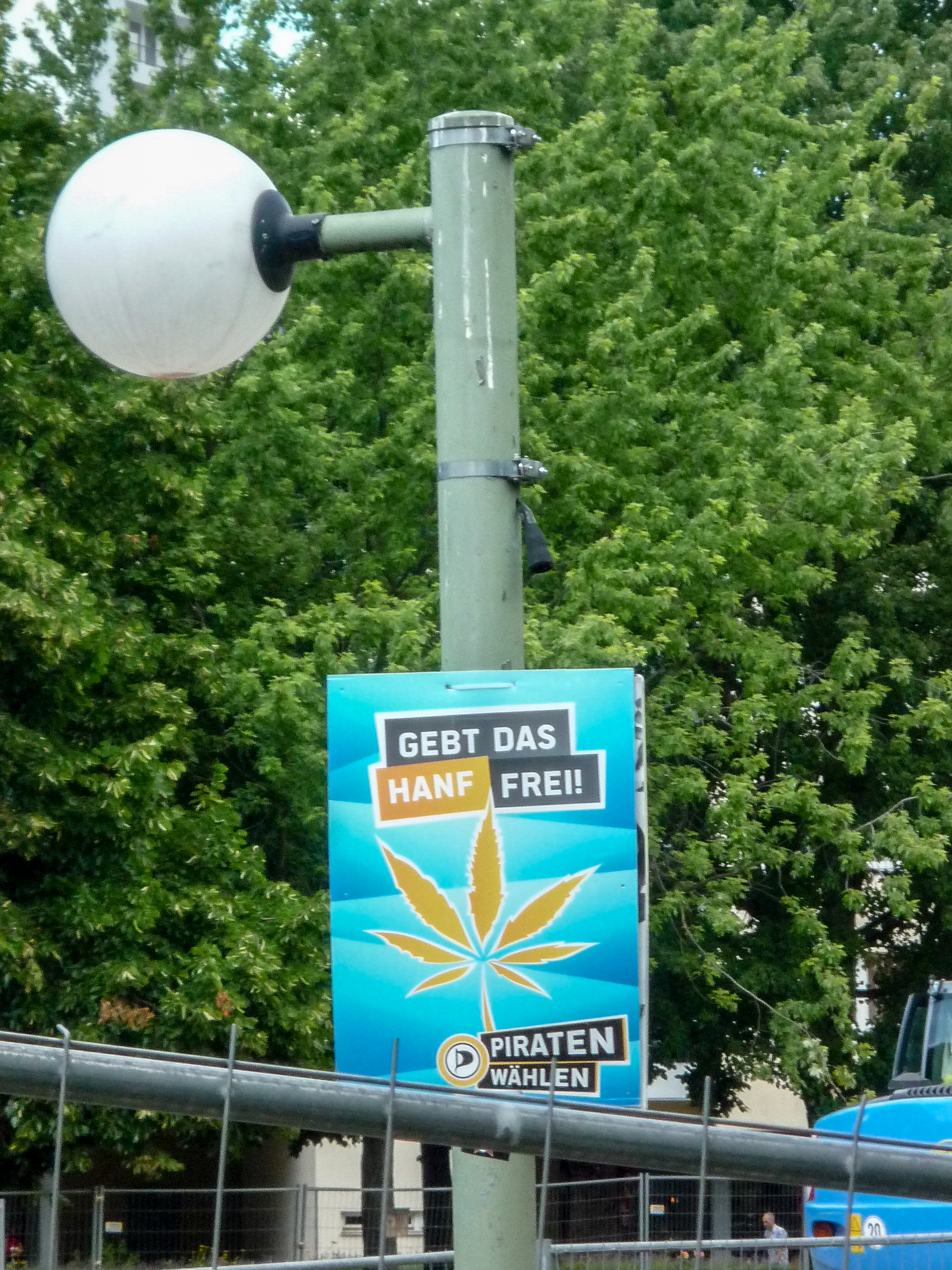
A Pirate Party Germany election placard in Berlin in 2014, stating "Release the hemp!" (Gebt das Hanf frei!)

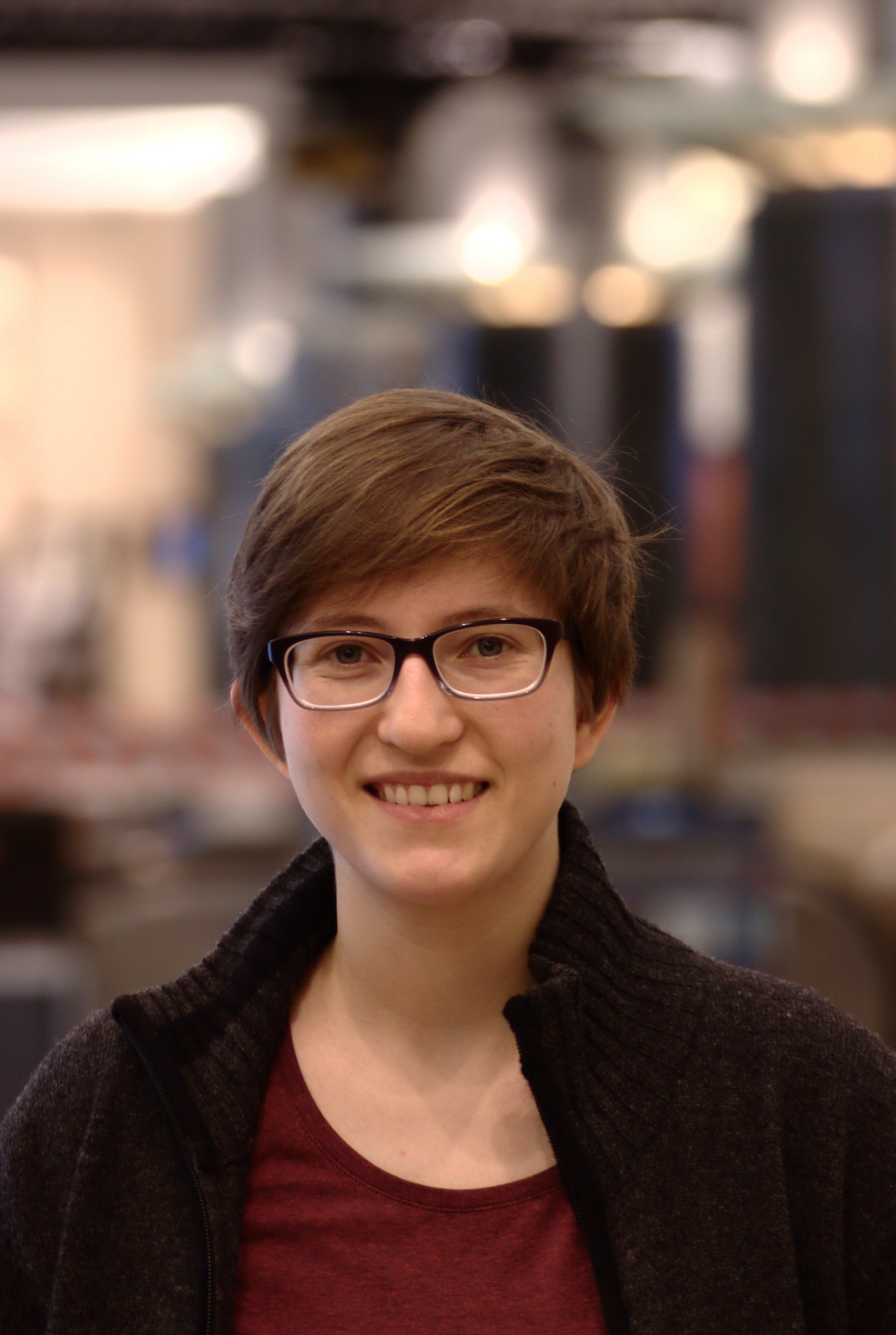
Felix Reda – the Pirate MEP for the 2014 to 2019 term

In the 2014 European parliament elections, the Pirate Party received 1.45% of the national vote (424,510 votes in total) and returned a single Member of the European Parliament. The elected MEP, Felix Reda, joined the Greens–European Free Alliance as an independent.

=== 2016 Berlin state election ===
The Berlin state election on September witnessed the collapse of support for the Pirate Party in their erstwhile stronghold of Berlin. Their previous vote of 8.9% achieved in 2011 fell to 1.7% and the Pirate Party lost all representation in the Berlin State assembly. The poor result was compounded by the murder-suicide committed by former Pirate Party assembly member Gerwald Claus-Brunner.

=== 2017 dropout from state parliaments ===
Together with the satirical party Die PARTEI the Pirate Party nominated Engelbert Sonneborn as candidate for the German presidential election in February 2017.

The Pirate Party continued to decline in 2017, dropping out from state parliaments. In the Saarland state election in March 2017, the Pirate Party received only 0.7% of the voter share and therefore lost all its seats in the Landtag of the Saarland. With the North Rhine-Westphalia state election in which it lost every seat, the Pirate Party is no longer represented in any state parliament.

=== 2019 European Parliament election ===
In the 2019 European Parliament election, the Pirate Party received a 0.65% share of the national vote (243,302 total votes) and retained their MEP seat, with their lead candidate Patrick Breyer being elected.

=== 2021 federal election ===
In the 2021 federal election, the Pirate Party received 0.37% of the national vote (169,587 votes in total).

=== 2024 European Parliament election ===
In the 2024 European Parliament election, the Pirate Party lost all representation in the European Parliament, receiving 0.47% of the national vote (186,683 votes in total). Due to these results, it lost its eligibility for state funding, as per Section 18 of German Law on Political Parties (Parteiengesetz).

=== 2025 federal election ===
In the 2025 federal election, the Pirate Party collapsed completely, receiving only 0.03% of the national vote (13,800 votes in total). This marks a 91.86% loss of voters compared to the 2021 federal election.

=== 2025 North Rhine-Westphalia local elections ===
In the 2025 North Rhine-Westphalia local elections, after the devastating results of the 2025 federal election, the decline of the Pirate Party continued on the local level. It received 0.08% of the vote (6,330 votes in total), down from the 0.3% (24,812 votes in total) it received in the 2020 elections. This marks a loss of 18,482 votes or approximately 73.3% of electoral support. As a result, the party secured only three seats in district councils, losing seven of the ten seats it had secured in 2020, confirming its inability to mitigate or reverse its electoral and political decline.

=== 2026 Berlin state election ===
In the 2026 Berlin state election, the Pirate Party failed to participate. Although it submitted a state list, it was not approved because it did not manage to meet the signature requirement.

== Election results ==
=== Bundestag ===
Election	Leader	Votes	%	Seats	+/–	Government
2009	Jens Seipenbusch	847,870	1.95 (#7)	0 / 622	New	Extra-parliamentary
2013	Bernd Schlömer	959,177	2.19 (#9)	0 / 631	0	Extra-parliamentary
2017	Patrick Schiffer (de)	173,476	0.37 (#12)	0 / 709	0	Extra-parliamentary
2021	Sebastian Alscher (de)	169,587	0.37 (#12)	0 / 709	0	Extra-parliamentary
2025	Borys Sobieski (de)	13,800	0.03 (#21)	0 / 630	0	Extra-parliamentary

=== European Parliament ===
Election	List leader	Votes	%	Seats	+/–	EP Group
2009	Andreas Popp	229,464	0.87 (#11)	0 / 99	New	–
2014	Felix Reda	425,044	1.45 (#9)	1 / 96	▲1	Greens/EFA
2019	Patrick Breyer	243,302	0.65 (#11)	1 / 96	0	Greens/EFA
2024	Anja Hirschel	186,773	0.47 (#16)	0 / 96	▼1	–
