= Dirk Poot =

Dutch programmer and politician

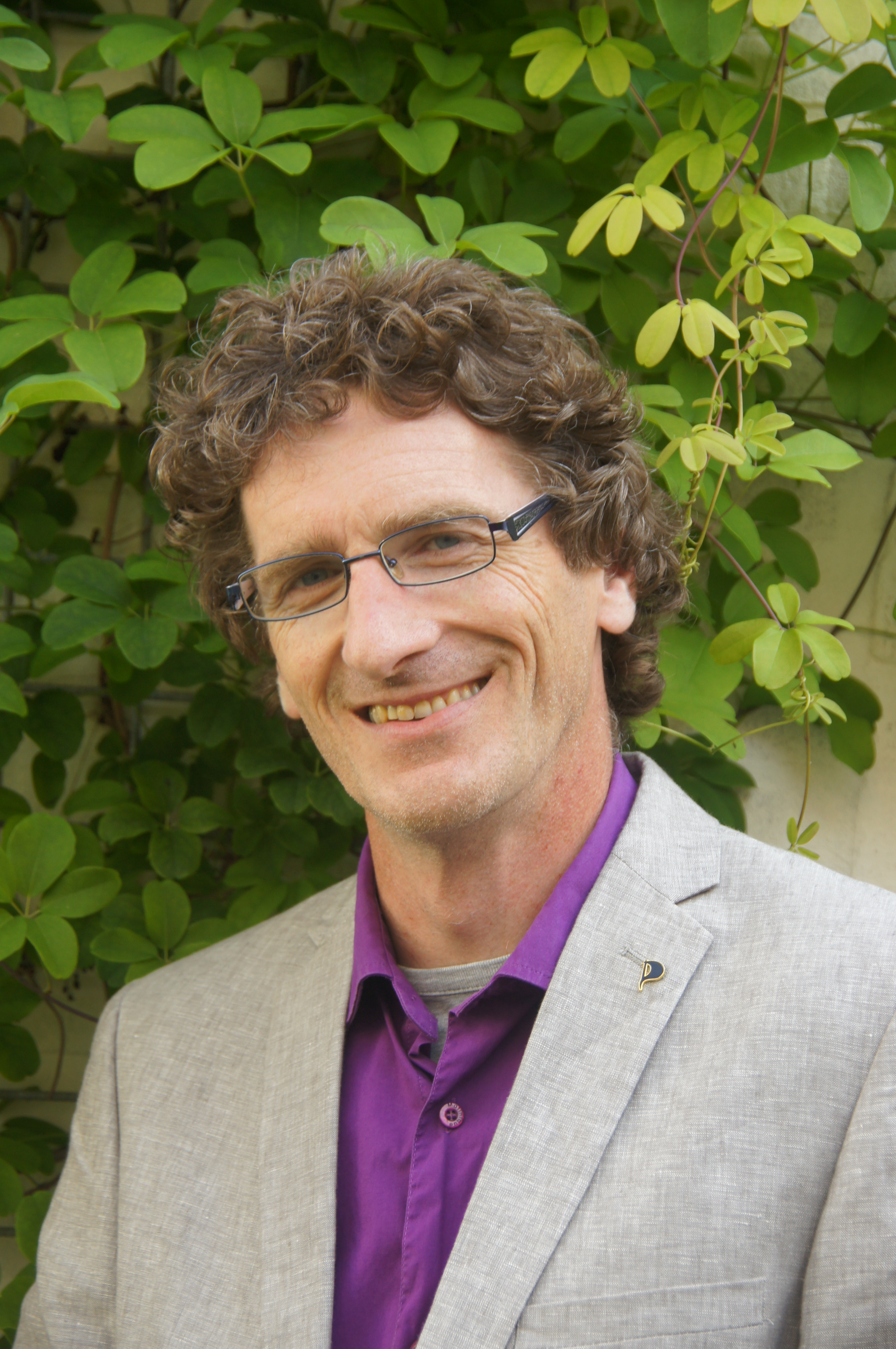

Lijsttrekker and spokesperson, Dutch Pirate Party
- In office 2012–2016
- Preceded by: Samir Allioui
- Succeeded by: Ancilla van de Leest

Personal details
- Born: 1968 (age 57–58) Utrecht, Netherlands
- Party: Pirate Party of the Netherlands
- Occupation: Programmer

Dirk Poot (born 1968) is a Dutch programmer and politician who is a former lijsttrekker and spokesperson for the board of the Pirate Party of the Netherlands. Poot was the lijsttrekker of the Dutch Pirate Party for the Dutch parliamentary elections in 2012 and fourth on the list for the Pirate Party in the 2010 Dutch parliamentary elections.

== Personal life ==
Poot studied business administration in Breukelen and medicine in Sint Eustatius.

He currently resides close to Breda in the Netherlands.

== Professional work ==
Poot is a self-employed computer programmer, focusing on medical and education software. He has previously worked as a physician.

== Political activities ==
When he was younger, Poot was a member of the Jongerenorganisatie Vrijheid en Democratie (JOVD), the youth organization of the main Dutch conservative party, the People's Party for Freedom and Democracy (VVD).

He has been blogging about democracy, privacy, and medical issues since 2005. He has written about collection and storage of sensitive information in government databases, in particular the Electronic Patient Record (EPR).

=== Dutch Pirate Party ===
Poot has been active with the Pirate Party since late 2009. He joined the party after discovering it through IRC while blogging about Anti-Counterfeiting Trade Agreement.

He was fourth on the list for the Pirate Party in the 2010 Dutch parliamentary elections. Since 2011, he has been a member of the board of the Dutch Pirate Party, and the board's spokesperson since December 2011. In the 2012 parliamentary elections in the Netherlands, he was the first candidate of the Dutch Pirate Party.
