= Anti-facial recognition movement =

Movement opposing facial recognition technology

The anti-facial recognition movement is a global effort advocating against the use of facial recognition technology (FRT) in public. Reasons cited include concerns about surveillance due to its gender and racial biases, threats to privacy, and disproportionate impacts on marginalized communities. Civil rights activists and researchers argue that FRT reinforces systemic discrimination, specifically towards visually racialized populations, as well as women and gender non-conforming individuals. Additionally, this movement highlights concerns over mass surveillance, wrongful arrests, and the erosion of civil liberties.

== Background on FRT ==
Facial recognition technology has been evolving since the visual capacity of computers emerged in the mid-20th century. Since its inception, there have been growing concerns about violation of privacy in public spaces, and algorithmic biases leading to wrongful arrests of people specifically of ethnic racial backgrounds and ambiguous gender presentation. These surveillance systems have adopted recent artificial intelligence (AI) driven systems, amplifying its potential to do harm. Specifically when these AI driven systems are used as an assistive technology for law enforcement and public safety. Its increasing use as evidence to identify people who commit crime to aid in an effort to aid public safety has increased incidents of abuse and false identification.

== Criminalization of public spaces ==
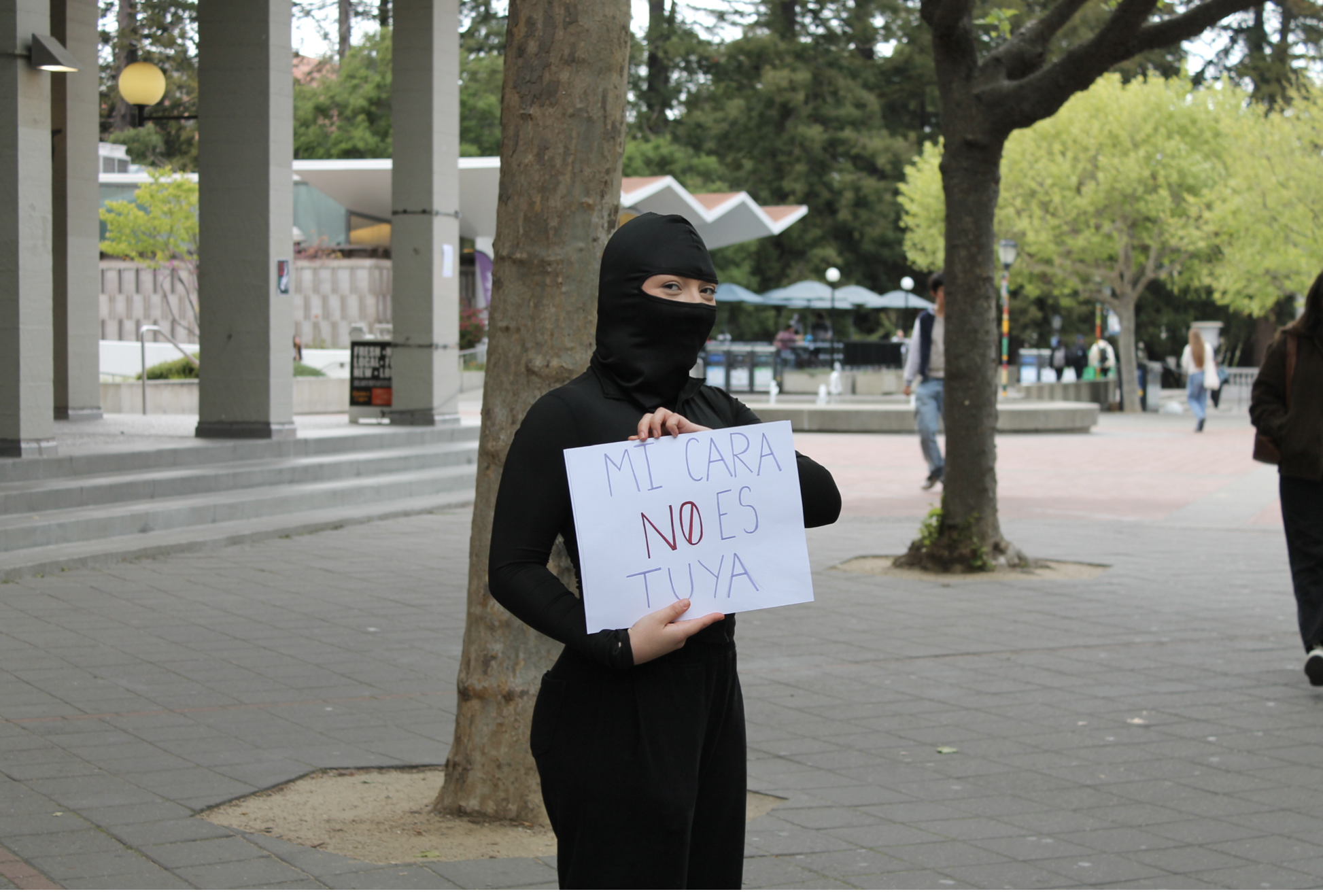

Activists are concerned that there has been a consistent pattern of facial recognition being deployed in areas that are largely popularized by black, indigenous, people of color, reinforcing systemic discrimination. A study published in the Journal of Information, Communications in Society and Ethics demonstrates that facial recognition technology, as developed and applied in Western contexts, tends to reinforce existing racial inequalities in policing practices—such as stops, investigations, arrests, and incarceration—further exacerbates the harmful impacts of systemic racism on historically marginalized communities, particularly Black individuals. The study also suggests no implementation of an allegedly racism-free biometric technology is safe from the risk of racially discriminating, simply because each implementation leans against our society, which is affected by racism in many persisting ways.

FRT making a heavy presence on communities of color, especially those who participate in social organizing around their communities, can inflict fear of rallying, protesting, community gatherings, and cultural events.

== Global movements ==
=== Russia ===
Roskomsvoboda, a non-governmental organization, focused on the field of digital rights protections and digital empowerment, launched a campaign named BanCam, calling for a moratorium on the government's mass use of facial recognition. Some of their arguments also include concerns over non-consensual surveillance, abuse, and data leaks. They even argue that depending on race, gender, and age, there is up to a 35% chance of erroneous recognition. Organizers demand for the government to halt use of facial recognition until the effects are studied and the government adopts legal reinforcements to keep the protection of their data.

=== Argentina ===
Asociación por los Derechos Civiles (ADC), a civil society organization, based in Buenos Aires, Argentina, works to promote and defend civil and human rights across Argentina and the larger Latin America, since its founding in 1995. In 2017, law enforcement in Mendoza, Argentina, began using FRT in order to identify those with pending arrest warrants. With this technology, Mendoza police were able to identify more than 100 individuals, by actively using this technology in public spaces. More notably, this technology was able to scan around 11,000 faces at popular spaces such as their Grape Harvest Festival and Malvinas Argentinian stadium. Police used 20 facial recognition kits that include a high resolution camera and a processor with an onboard database of wanted individuals. These practices were major concerns to ADC organizers and took action to file a lawsuit against the city of Buenos Aires, specifically targeting the constitutionality of Resolution 398/19. This resolution authorized the implementation of a facial recognition system linked to a database of individuals with outstanding arrest warrants. Although the majority of facial recognition systems have been implemented in Argentina’s capital, ADC reported that, as of early 2021, the technology had also been introduced or tested in the provinces of Córdoba, Salta, and Mendoza, as well as in the county of Tigre in Buenos Aires Province. Plans for further deployment were also underway in the province of Santa Fe. The ADC argues that the resolution lacked adequate legal safeguards, transparency, and oversight creating the potential for abuse and violating fundamental rights such as privacy, freedom of expression, and due process, especially for already marginalized communities.

=== France ===
La Quadrature du Net (LQDN), founded in 2008. This organization promotes and defends the fundamental freedoms in the digital world and fight against surveillance from both states and private companies. LQDN called for a ban on the mass use of facial recognition to identify protesters. The French government has adopted several official orders that allow the identification of those participating in protest and public organizing by syncing its technology with wide databases. Its organizers also petitioned France’s highest administrative court to overturn Article R.40-26 of the Code of Criminal Procedure, which authorizes the use of facial recognition technology to identify suspects during criminal investigations. LQDN argued that such use was not “strictly necessary,” as required by the French interpretation of Article 10 of the Law Enforcement Directive (LED). However, the court rejected the challenge, stating that the large volume of data in the TAJ database made automated facial recognition processing essential. This ruling contributes to the ongoing debate over how the LED’s necessity standard should be applied to biometric technologies.

=== United States ===
The concept of "the right to appear" refers to the fundamental right of existing in public spaces without the fear of suppression. FRT opponents argue that facial recognition technology challenges this right by enabling mass surveillance, disproportionately targeting marginalized communities, and putting them at risk for misidentification.In June 2020, there was an emergence of nationwide protests following the deaths of Ahmaud Arbery, Breonna Taylor, and George Floyd, major tech companies responded to growing concerns about the role of facial recognition in policing. IBM announced a complete withdrawal from facial recognition technology, stating it would no longer develop, use, or sell such tools, nor support third-party vendors. Around the same time, Amazon and Microsoft both declared moratoriums on selling facial recognition systems to law enforcement agencies. However, shortly after these announcements, the American Civil Liberties Union (ACLU) disclosed that Microsoft had previously attempted to sell facial recognition technology to the U.S. Drug Enforcement Administration between 2017 and 2019.

== Sexism in FRT ==
Facial recognition technology has also been criticized for gender biases, particularly because studies have indicated that it misidentifies women at 18% higher rates than men. These errors stem from the way AI systems are trained, along with the databases used in their development. Studies show that FRT systems, including Amazon's Rekognition, misidentify women more often than men, with even greater inaccuracies for women of color.

== Racial biases ==
FRT has come under increasing scrutiny for its role in wrongful arrests, particularly of Black individuals, due to algorithmic errors and insufficient investigative follow-up. A 2021 academic study found that the use of facial recognition technology by police in Western societies reinforce existing racial disparities in law enforcement practices, such as stops, investigations, and arrests. The research suggests that these technologies can exacerbate the psychological and social effects of racism on historically marginalized communities, particularly Black individuals, and may contribute to further racial discrimination despite claims of neutrality. A case study conducted in 2021, presented in Government Information Quarterly, by Georgia State University scholars, analyzed data from 1,136 U.S. cities and found that the use of FRT by police agencies was associated with increased racial disparities in arrest rates. The research, which used data from the Bureau of Justice Statistics, FBI Uniform Crime Report, and the U.S. Census Bureau, reported that FRT use correlated with higher arrest rates for Black individuals and lower rates for White individuals. The disparity was particularly pronounced in adult arrest statistics. The study recommended that civic leaders and law enforcement agencies carefully evaluate the structural and policy-related factors influencing how FRT is used and called for stronger oversight and policy guidance to mitigate potential bias in FRT-assisted policing.

A notable case of racial misidentification occurred on January 9, 2020, when Robert Williams, a 45-year-old Black man from the Detroit suburbs, was wrongfully arrested in front of his wife and children. He was accused of stealing a watch from a jewelry store, an incident he had no connection to. The arrest was made almost entirely based on a facial recognition match, which was later proven to be incorrect. Williams spent nearly 30 hours in custody, and the case became a prominent example of the dangers associated with relying on flawed FRT for criminal investigations.

At the time of this investigation, there had been at least 3 documented wrongful arrests that involved Black men being falsely matched by facial recognition software. Some other cases include those of Nijeer Parks in New Jersey and Michael Oliver in Michigan. These cases can expose how algorithmic biases, in which systems have been trained this way, can and have escalated into legal and social harm of innocent people. Especially when law enforcement uses these bias facial recognition technologies as definitive evidence.

A study conducted in 2019 by the National Institute of Standards and Technology shows how many commercial facial recognition systems misidentify Black and Asian faces 10 to 100 times more frequently than white faces.

These disparities raise several concerns among anti facial recognition advocates as they challenge the validity of FRT in legal and surveillance spaces, especially in over-policed communities of color. Civil rights organizers and researchers have called for structural regulations, transparency, and even outright bans on the use of FRT by government agencies. They argue that racial biases in these supposed advanced technologies not only undermine public trust but also perpetuate already existing systemic inequalities.

=== Impacts on undocumented communities ===
Undocumented immigrants possess limited constitutional and privacy protections in the United States, which makes the collection and use of their biometric data particularly vulnerable to misuse. Federal agencies, including the Department of Homeland Security (DHS) and Immigration and Customs Enforcement (ICE), have employed facial recognition technologies to identify, track, and apprehend undocumented individuals. This practice has raised concerns about violations of constitutional rights, such as protection against unreasonable searches and due process, as well as the potential for racial discrimination. However, these rights are often under-enforced in immigration proceedings.

Given the unique risks posed by facial recognition and the inadequacy of existing privacy safeguards, some legal scholars have proposed exploring intellectual property (IP) law as an alternative means of protection. This approach would involve granting individuals proprietary rights over their facial data, such as facial recognition templates, to provide stronger control and legal recourse—particularly for undocumented immigrants, who lack other forms of legal protection. While this would require adapting current IP frameworks, it may offer a viable solution for addressing civil liberties concerns.

This perspective builds on critiques of current immigration policy and highlights the legal challenges undocumented individuals face when attempting to suppress biometric evidence in deportation cases. It further argues for the expansion of civil rights protections beyond traditional legal avenues, particularly as inaccuracies in facial recognition systems—caused by factors like lighting, camera angle, facial expression, and even biases in software—can lead to misidentification and wrongful targeting.
