= Trots op Nederland =

- Founder: Rita Verdonk
- Founded: 17 October 2007; 18 years ago
- Split from: People's Party for Freedom and Democracy
- Headquarters: Postbus 60; 2501 CB The Hague
- Ideology: National liberalism Soft Euroscepticism
- Political position: Right-wing
- Colours: Red, White, Blue & Orange

Website
- www.trotsnl.nl

Trots op Nederland (TON, short: Trots; English: "Proud of the Netherlands") is a political party in the Netherlands. It was founded by Rita Verdonk, an independent member of the House of Representatives, previously a member of the People's Party for Freedom and Democracy (VVD).

== History ==
On 3 April 2008, Verdonk launched the party. A subsequent poll by Maurice De Hond indicated that Trots op Nederland and the Labour Party would be tied for second place with 22 seats each in the Dutch Parliament which counts 150 seats. Verdonk declared that her movement would consist of "sympathizers" and, like the Party for Freedom, would not have a membership structure. However, on 7 July 2009, it was announced that the "movement" would become a Dutch political party.

Verdonk stated that she wanted to use the party's own wiki as a debating platform for citizens. The party was labeled as right wing and conservative liberal by the Dutch newspaper NRC Handelsblad. An opinion poll by Interview-NSS taken in week 42 of 2007 showed that Verdonk's movement would obtain 9.9% of the parliamentary vote, with losses for the People's Party for Freedom and Democracy, Party for Freedom and the Socialist Party.

After the party's launch, its popularity has gradually dwindled. Starting from the middle of 2009 polls showed the party winning at most one seat. On 3 March 2010, the party participated for the first time in Dutch municipal elections of 2010. The party had a reasonable showing for a new party capturing nearly fifty seats in thirty different local councils. In Den Helder it was the second largest party. In the Dutch general election of 2010 on 9 June 2010 Verdonk did not receive enough votes to secure a seat in the House of Representatives. As a result, she decided to drop out of national politics.

The party was going to participate in the general election of 2012; however, on 9 June 2012, Hero Brinkman announced that the Onafhankelijke Burger Partij (OBP) was merging with Trots op Nederland to form a new party: the Democratic Political Turning Point. On 19 November 2012, the merger was stopped and Trots op Nederland continued as an independent party.

== Views and policies ==
The party described its platform under the acronym PRIDE which consists of eight main themes: education, integration, regulation, security, immigration, traffic management, social care, and development cooperation.

The party stated that it stood for individual freedom and that government policy should serve the citizen and not the other way around. In Verdonk's vision, a small but decisive government works best, which enforces the most necessary laws strictly and justly. That means fewer rules, fewer civil servants, but more entrepreneurship and more room for self-confident citizens. The party also supports stricter measures against crime.

Other policies include:

- Reforming laws to allow citizens to defend themselves and their private property.
- Introduction of jury trial.
- The top of the civil service is automatically dismissed if the incumbent minister or alderman leaves. The new director determines who will subsequently be appointed as new employees.
- Choice of life imprisonment or voluntary castration of convicted pedophiles.
