= USPP =

USPP may refer to:

- Ultra-short period planet
- United States Park Police
- United States Pirate Party
- United States Plant Patent
- United States presidential primary
- The ICAO airport code for Bolshoye Savino Airport
