= Alexander Shubin =

Alexander or Aleksandr Shubin may refer to:

- Alexander Shubin (figure skater) (born 1983), Russian competitive figure skater
- Aleksandr Shubin (historian) (born 1965), Russian historian and politician
