= Ancilla van de Leest =

Dutch politician, former fetish model, producer, presenter and activist

Ancilla Tilia van de Leest
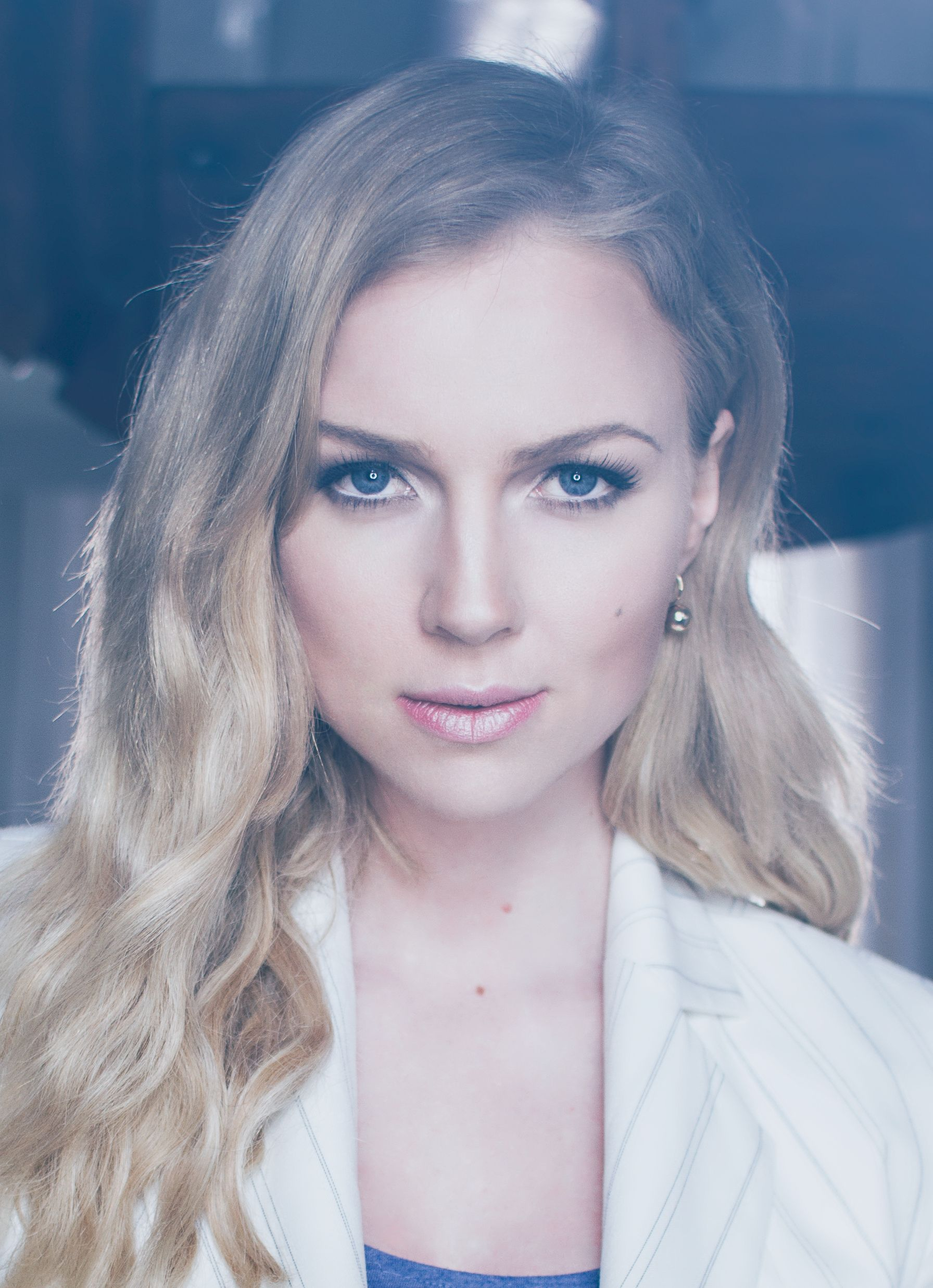
- Born: Linde van de Leest; 21 July 1985 (age 40); Rotterdam, Netherlands
- Occupations: Model; Actress; Politician; Activist

Ancilla van de Leest (born 21 July 1985), born as Linde van de Leest is a Dutch politician, former fetish model, producer, presenter, and activist.

== Modeling and media career ==
Van de Leest attended gymnasium in Rotterdam and worked as a waitress when she was discovered by a photographer. She quit school and at eighteen appeared under her birth name as a Playmate in the Dutch edition of men's magazine Playboy in May 2004. Afterwards she moved to Los Angeles for work and adopted the name Ancilla Tilia. In June 2009, Van de Leest appeared on the cover of Dutch Playboy, in a photo session by the photographer and music video director Carli Hermès.

From 2008 to 2010, she wrote the "Ask Ancilla" section for the FHM magazine, which eventually became a full-page column that appeared monthly until 2010. In 2011, she wrote a section for the book Aan mijn jongere ik ("To my younger self").

In September 2012, she again appeared on the cover of Dutch Playboy. She also appeared twice on the cover of the Dutch edition of FHM, as well as on the covers of Sp!ts, Rotterdams Dagblad, Panorama, Aktueel and Viva. Van de Leest appeared in erotic fetish photography, specializing in latex clothes, corsets, high heels and stockings. As a fetish model, she appeared on the cover of Bizarre, Marquis and The Picture. In 2012 Van de Leest ended her career as a model.

In November 2013, she appeared in the first episode of the Dutch Popoz comedy series on Comedy Central. In 2013, she won the BNN's Nationale Reistest (a travel knowledge competition) as the "Famous Dutch person".

In 2024, she replaced Sanae Orchi as the presenter of Blckbx, a Dutch independent and critical TV news outlet.

== Pirate-Party ==
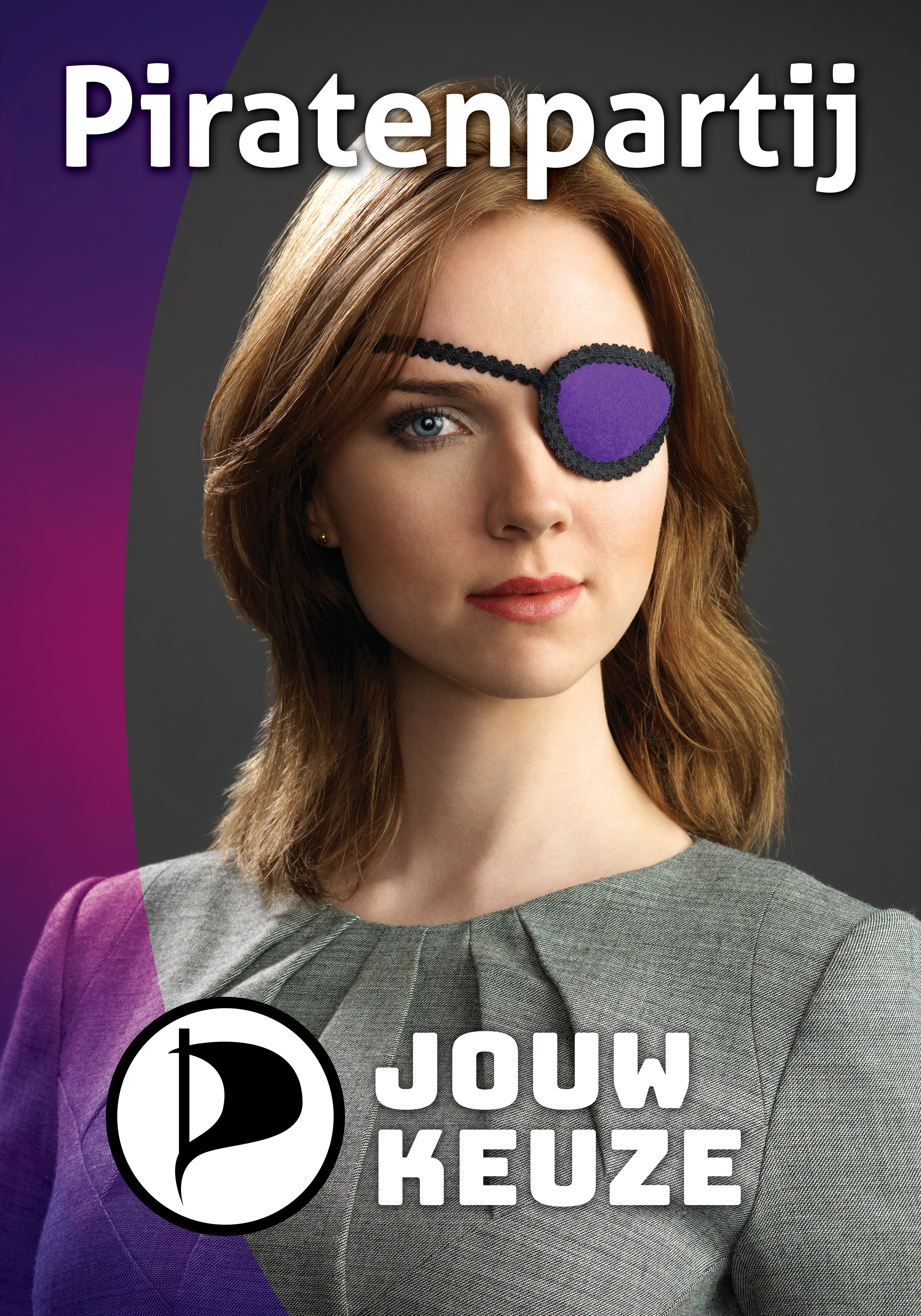
Campaign poster featuring van de Leest used by the Pirate Party for the 2017 Dutch general election

On 26 June 2016 Van de Leest was elected as the top candidate of the Pirate Party of the Netherlands for the Dutch parliamentary elections in 2017.

In interviews Van de Leest indicated that her priorities are aimed at strengthening privacy-rights and opposing abolishing cash. She foresees a development in which high costs are imposed on entrepreneurs who use cash in order to stimulate digital currency. This she sees as a privacy undermining development in which a person can be followed on the basis of their payment history. In addition to privacy-rights in general, the party specifically focusses on strengthening privacy in the relationship between the government and its citizens, as the government poses a greater risk than corporations of infringing their fundamental rights. In September 2016 she stood up for the victims of a data-breach in the town of Almelo.

On 6 April 2017, Ancilla announced that she would be leaving the Pirate-Party and would instead focus on her own projects. She will be a passive member and is going to continue to give advice to future party-members.

== Libertarian Party ==
For the 2025 Dutch general election, van de Leest was on the candidate list of the Libertarian Party.
