= Toine Manders (born 1969) =

Dutch jurist and politician (born 1969)

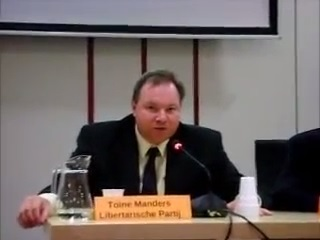
Manders in 2012

Twanij Theodorus Antonius Johannes "Toine" Manders (born 17 August 1969) is a Dutch jurist and politician who led the Libertarian Party (LP), a minor political party, from 1994 to 2014.

A native of in Deurne, North Brabant, he was director of the Haags Juristen College (HJC), translated as "Hague Lawyers Board", which was founded in 1984 and until 1996 helped some 6,000 tax payers to avoid taxes.

On 1 July 2010, the District Court in The Hague, declared the bankruptcy of the HJC as a result of a claim by the tax authorities. After the bankruptcy declaration the trustee who was entrusted with the settlement of the bankruptcy filed a legal complaint against Toine Manders for embezzlement and bankruptcy fraud.

== Electoral history ==
Electoral history of Toine Manders
Year	Body	Party	Pos.	Votes	Result		Ref.
Year	Body	Party	Pos.	Votes	Party seats	Individual	Ref.
1994	House of Representatives	Libertarian Party	1	1,789	0	Lost	
2012	House of Representatives	Libertarian Party	1	2,716	0	Lost	
2017	House of Representatives	Libertarian Party	18 (Note: Manders participated as a lijstduwer.)	96	0	Lost	
2023	House of Representatives	Belang van Nederland	44	218	0	Lost	
2024	European Parliament	Belang van Nederland	10	269	0	Lost	
2025	House of Representatives	Belang van Nederland	9	335	0	Lost	
