= Roskomsvoboda =

Russian digital rights NGO

- Founded: 1 November 2012
- Founder: Stanislav Shakirov, Artem Kozlyuk, Sarkis Darbinyan
- Dissolved: 9 October 2025; 12 months ago
- Type: Non-profit
- Purpose: Digital rights
- Location: Russia
- Origins: Pirate Party of Russia
- Region served: Russia
- Services: Digital media Legal advocacy Cybersecurity
- Key people: Stanislav Shakirov, Artem Kozlyuk, Sarkis Darbinyan, Nataliya Malysheva
- Employees: About 20 employees
- Website: roskomsvoboda.org

Roskomsvoboda (Russian: Роскомсвобода) was a Russian non-governmental organization that supported open self-regulatory networks and protection of digital rights of Internet users. The organization aimed to counteract censorship on the Internet and to popularize the ideas of freedom of information and self-regulation.

On 23 December 2022, the Russia's Ministry of Justice added the organisation to the "foreign agent" list.

In October 2025, Artyom Kozlyuk announced his resignation from the post of head of Roskomsvoboda, as well as the shutdown of the project from September 2025.

== Foundation ==
On November 1, 2012, the Roskomsvoboda Foundation held a press conference in Moscow, the same date as the Russian Internet Restriction Bill became law. A representatives of the Pirate Party of Russia and a member of the European Parliament from the Pirate Party of Sweden, Amelia Andersdotter, took part in the event.

== Activities ==
Roskomsvoboda monitors the state Register of information, dissemination of which is prohibited within the Russian Federation, and the Register of Information dissemination organizers (IDO).

The Federal Service for Supervision of Communications, Information Technology and Mass Media (Roskomnadzor) includes messenger services and similar online services, defined by the respective law as Information dissemination organizers (IDO) upon request of the Federal Security Service (FSB) to the special state Register. Thereafter, such services and websites were obliged to collect and store all user-generated data and information about users online activity, including the content of their messages, calls, shared files, etc., as well as to supply such data to the FSB upon its request.

=== Campaigns ===
==== Digital defense ====
"Digital defense" was a public campaign in 2019 against the "sovereign Runet" that governs internet use in Russia.

As part of the campaign, Roskomsvoboda seeks to prevent the adoption of draft law No. 608767-7 "on the sovereignty of the Runet", submitted to the parliament by senators Andrei Klishas and Lyudmila Bokova, as well as deputy Andrei Lugovoy.

Rules proposed by the draft law will place the routing of the Network under State control, specifically the governmental body Roskomnadzor. Officials of Roskomnadzor would have the authority to order ISPs how to organize Internet traffic routes. It is assumed that ISPs would be obliged to have equipment that filters traffic using deep packet inspection (DPI). Internet exchange points and cross-border traffic shall also be taken under governmental control.

==== FreeBogatov ====
Roskomsvoboda launched the #FreeBogatov campaign in 2017 to support Dmitriy Bogatov who was arrested on April 6, 2017, and accused of calling for extremism and terrorism actions. Dmitry Bogatov was a Tor administrator, whose IP address, among many IP addresses of other Tor nodes, was used by another person while posting calls for riots and participation in an uncoordinated protests.

Demands for the release of Bogatov were sounded at Participants of the Moscow rally for Internet freedom. Charges were finally dropped as a result of the team of lawyers, including Sarkis Darbinian of Roskomvoboda.
