= Lola Voronina =

Russian politician

- Лола Воронина
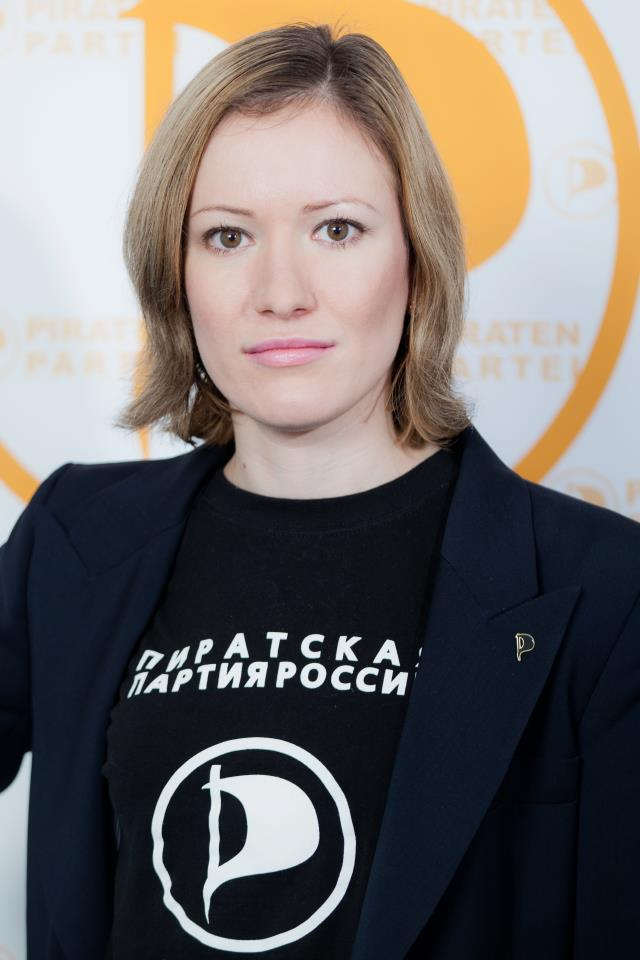

Co-Chair of Pirate Parties International
- In office 15 April 2012 – 21 April 2013 Serving with Grégory Engels
- Preceded by: Samir Allioui
- Succeeded by: Vojtěch Pikal

Chief Administration Officer of Pirate Parties International
- In office 13 March 2011 – 15 April 2012
- Preceded by: Joachim Mönch
- Succeeded by: Travis McCrea

Personal details
- Born: 26 November 1983 (age 42) Leningrad
- Party: Pirate Party of Russia
- Other political affiliations: Pirate Parties International
- Website: www.pirate-party.ru

Lola Voronina (Russian: Ло́ла Воро́нина; born 26 November 1983) is a Russian politician of the Pirate Party of Russia (PPRU), and has been beside the Russian born German Grégory Engels of the Pirate Party Germany co-chairperson of Pirate Parties International (PPI) since 15 April 2012.

Voronina was born in Leningrad, in the former Soviet Union. She was also secretary-general of the PPI, the umbrella organization of the international Pirate Party movement, from 13 March 2011 to 15 April 2012. She lives in Prague, Czech Republic.
