= Onafhankelijke Burger Partij =

Onafhankelijke Burger Partij Onafhankelijke Burger Partij
- Founder: Hero Brinkman
- Founded: April 24, 2012 November 17th, 2012
- Dissolved: June 19, 2012 (re-founded on November 17th)
- Split from: Party for Freedom
- Merged into: Democratic Political Turning Point (dissolved on November 17th)
- Ideology: Conservative liberalism Soft Euroscepticism; Anti-Islam; Populism
- Political position: Right-wing
- Colours: Orange

Website
- onafhankelijkeburgerpartij.nl

The Onafhankelijke Burger Partij (English: Independent Citizens' Party, OBP) was a political party in the Netherlands. It was founded by Hero Brinkman. Brinkman was elected as Member of the House of Representatives for the Party for Freedom (PVV) in 2006 and 2010. In 2012, Brinkman left the PVV after repeatedly criticising the lack of democracy within that party, as well as its negative generalisations about certain groups in society. After leaving PVV he retained his seat and founded the OBP with intention to participate in the Dutch general election of 2012. On June 9, 2012, he announced that the OBP would merge with the party Trots op Nederland to form a new party, the Democratic Political Turning Point (Dutch: Democratisch Politiek Keerpunt, DPK). The merger did not occur, after Trots op Nederland announced on November 17 as their management was unsatisfied with the conditions.
