= Pirate Party (Netherlands) =

Pirate Party Piratenpartij
- Chairman: Pejman Davish-Zadeh
- Founded: 10 March 2010; 16 years ago
- Ideology: Pirate politics Privacy; Open government Direct democracy Freedom of information
- International affiliation: Pirate Parties International
- European political alliance: European Pirate Party
- Colours: Purple
- Senate: 0 / 75
- House of Representatives: 0 / 150
- European Parliament: 0 / 31
- Enkhuizen city council: 1 / 17

Website
- piratenpartij.nl

The Pirate Party (Dutch: Piratenpartij, PPNL) is a political party in the Netherlands, formed in 2006 but not officially registered until 10 March 2010. The party is based on the model of the Swedish Pirate Party.

== Positions ==
The party purposefully limits itself to a limited number of positions. It wants to curb Dutch copyright law (where it wants non-commercial use to be free), to remodel patent law, to protect and strengthen (digital) civil rights, a transparent government and a considerate handling of IT-projects by the government. Its Declaration of Principles says that its purpose is "to change global legislation to facilitate the emerging information society, which is characterized by diversity and openness. We do this by requiring an increased level of respect for the citizens and their right to privacy, as well as reforms to copyright and patent law."

== Election results ==
=== General elections ===
Election	Lead candidate	List	Votes	Vote share	Seats	±	Ballot Access	Notes
2010	Samir Allioui	List	10,471	0.11%	0 / 150	New	19/19	
2012	Dirk Poot	List	30,600	0.32%	0 / 150	0	19/20 (Note: No ballot access in the Dutch Caribbean constituency)	
2017	Ancilla van de Leest	List	35,478	0.34%	0 / 150	0	19/20	
2021	Matthijs Pontier	List	22,878	0.22%	0 / 150	0	20/20	
2023	Matthijs Pontier	List	9,117	0.09%	0 / 150	0		
2025	Matthijs Pontier	List	10,575	0.10%	0 / 150	0		

=== European Parliament elections ===
The Pirate Party has participated in three European elections: in 2014, 2019, and 2024. The Pirate Party formed a common list with the From the Region Party in 2019 and with The Greens in 2024.

Election	List	Lead candidate	Votes	Vote share	Seats	+/–	EP Group
2014	List	Matthijs Pontier	40,216	0.85	0 / 26	New	–
2019	List	Sent Wierda	10,692	0.19	0 / 26	0	–
2024 (Note: In a joint list with The Greens.)	List	Matthijs Pontier	23,764	0.38	0 / 31	0	–

=== Provincial elections ===
Election	Province	Votes	Vote share	Seats
2015	North Holland	9,885	1.03%	0

=== Municipal elections ===
The party participated at the 2022 Dutch municipal elections. In the municipality of Enkhuizen, the party garnered 380 votes (5.03%), which earned the party a single seat (out of 17) in the Enkhuizen municipal council. Nationwide, the party gained 3,251 votes (0.05%), with the aforementioned seat being the only one earned (out of a total of 8,237).

Election	Municipality	Votes	Vote share	Seats
2014	Amsterdam	5,606	1.7%	0
2014	Amsterdam-Zuid (borough council)	2,187	3.5%	0
2014	Amsterdam-West (borough council)	1,981	3.6%	1
2014	Amsterdam-Noord (borough council)	526	1.8%	0
2014	Binnenmaas	279	2.2%	0
2014	Groningen	1,188	1.3%	0
2014	Zwolle	798	1.4%	0
2018	Amsterdam	4,459	1.3%	0
2018	Utrecht	1,254	0.8%	0
2022	Eindhoven	1,064	1.4%	0
2022	Enkhuizen	380	5.0%	1
2022	Middelburg	137	0.6%	0
2022	Nijmegen	634	0.8%	0
2022	Utrecht	1,036	0.7%	0

== International ==
Pirate Parties across the world Elected in EU Parliament Elected nationally Elected locally Registered for elections Registered in some administrative regions Unregistered but active Status unknown

The party is member of Pirate Parties International (PPI). International cooperation through the PPI is seen as crucial to realising the goals of the party. The positions of the party are based on the Pirate Party Declaration of Principles.

Samir Allioui, co-founder of PPNL and party leader during the 2010 elections, was Co-President of Pirate Parties International (PPI) from July 2009 until April 2010.

== See also ==
- Category:Pirate Party (Netherlands) politicians
