= Political parties and political designations in Massachusetts =

In the Commonwealth of Massachusetts (a U.S. state), there are two recognized political parties and an additional 32 political designations in which registered voters may choose to enroll. Voters may also choose to remain as "unenrolled voters" (i.e., independents). Political parties hold primary elections, while political designations do not. A political designation is a one-to-three word descriptive term which may appear next to candidates' names on election ballots.

== Background ==
To be recognized as a political designation in Massachusetts, fifty registered voters must file a document with the state seeking this status. To be recognized as a political party, a designation must either have obtained at least 3% of the vote for any state-wide office at the preceding biennial state election, or have enrolled at least 1% of all registered voters.

Election ballots include the candidates' names followed by either the candidates' party or their designation. In many cases, non-party designations still include the word "party" in their name. In 2025, however, only two such designations are recognized as parties: the Republican Party and the Democratic Party. The Libertarian Party became a "designation" after the 2024 Presidential General Election, as the Presidential ticket for Libertarian Party yielded 0.5% (one half of one percent) of the vote in Massachusetts.

== Enrolled and unenrolled voters ==
In Massachusetts, registered voters may choose to (1) enroll in a political party; (2) enroll with a political designation; or (3) choose to be an unenrolled voter (i.e., an independent).

Voters may change their enrollment status with their election official, with a deadline ten days before an election.

All registered voters may vote in general elections. Massachusetts voters enrolled in a particular party may vote only in that party's primary, and cannot cross-over to vote in another party's primary, but "unenrolled" voters may cast a primary ballot for any one of the parties. Political designations are treated as "unenrolled" voters for primary purposes, and so they too may choose to vote in one of the party primaries.

Under Massachusetts law, a political designation is created when fifty registered Massachusetts voters "file a form with the Secretary of the Commonwealth requesting that they, or any other voters, may change their registration to such designation." These non-party political designations may field candidates for statewide office, if they petition with a sufficient number of signatures (10,000).

The various political designations have generally small membership, although they have attracted some media attention.

== List of current parties and designations ==
As of 2026, the Secretary of the Commonwealth listed two officially recognized political parties and 32 officially recognized political designations in Massachusetts.

| Designation | MA Abbreviation | Type |
|---|---|---|
| Democratic Party | D | political party |
| Republican Party | R | political party |
| America First Party | V | non-party political designation |
| American Independent Party | Q | non-party political designation |
| American Term Limits | BB | non-party political designation |
| Conservative Party | A | non-party political designation |
| Constitution Party | K | non-party political designation |
| Forward Party | JJ | non-party political designation |
| Green Party USA | G | non-party political designation |
| Green-Rainbow Party | J | non-party political designation |
| Interdependent 3rd Party | T | non-party political designation |
| Latino-Vote Party | EE | non-party political designation |
| Libertarian | L | non-party political designation |
| Massachusetts Independent Party | O | non-party political designation |
| Natural Law Party | B | non-party political designation |
| New Alliance Party | N | non-party political designation |
| New World Council | C | non-party political designation |
| Pirate | X | non-party political designation |
| Pizza Party | AA | non-party political designation |
| Prohibition Party | P | non-party political designation |
| Rainbow Coalition | F | non-party political designation |
| Reform Party | E | non-party political designation |
| Socialism and Liberation | KK | non-party political designation |
| Socialist | S | non-party political designation |
| People's Party | FF | non-party political designation |
| Twelve Visions Party | DD | non-party political designation |
| Timesizing Not Downsizing | M | non-party political designation |
| United Independent Party | CC | non-party political designation |
| Unity Party | HH | non-party political designation |
| Veterans Party America | W | non-party political designation |
| We The People | H | non-party political designation |
| Workers Party | GG | non-party political designation |
| Working Families | Z | non-party political designation |
| World Citizens Party | Y | non-party political designation |

== See also ==
- List of elections in Massachusetts
- Political party strength in Massachusetts
