= Grégory Engels =

German politician (born 1976)

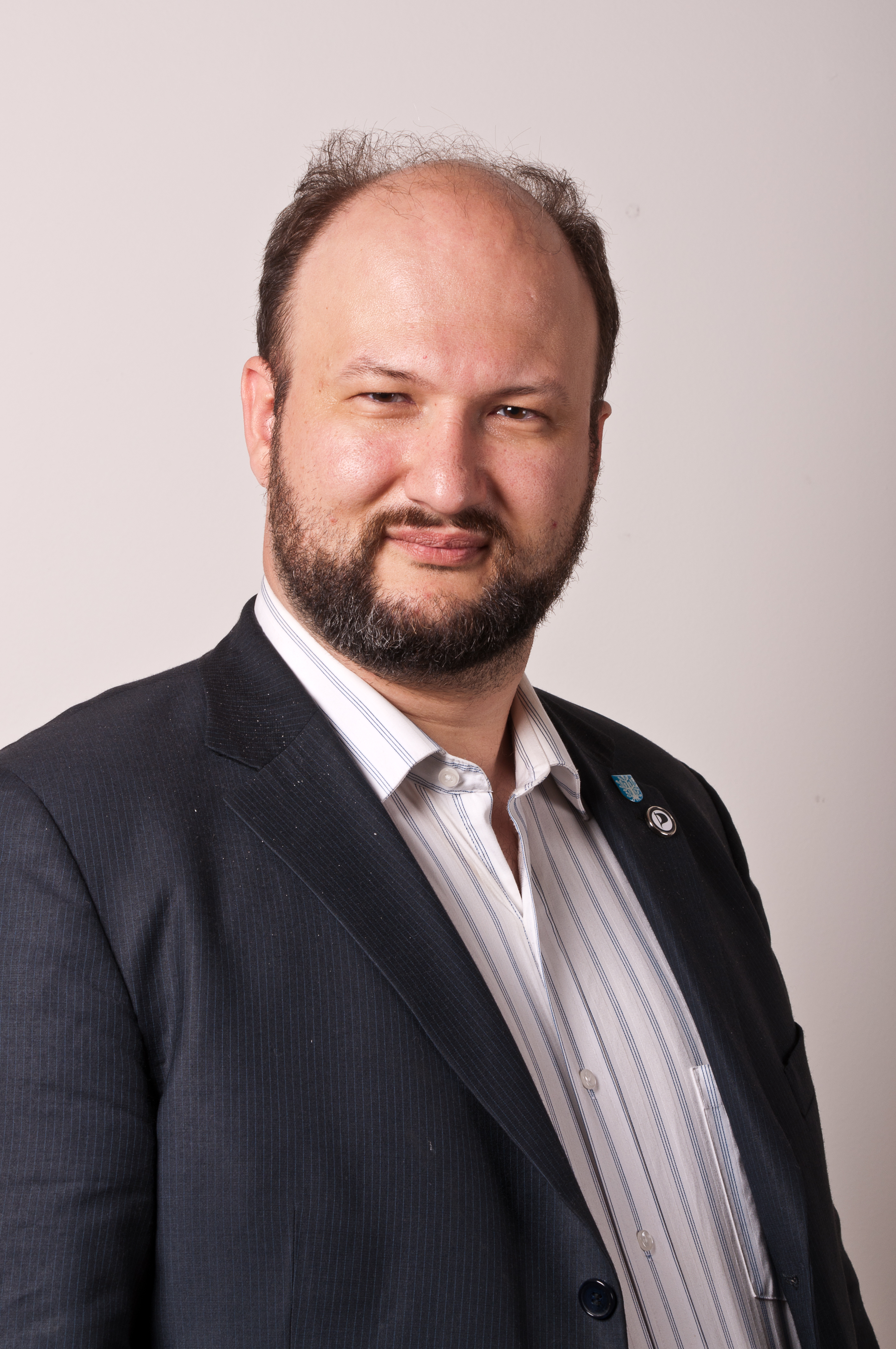

Co-Chair of Pirate Parties International
- In office 15 April 2012 – 13 March 2014 Serving with Lola Voronina (2012-2013); Vojtěch Pikal (2013-2014)
- Preceded by: Samir Allioui; Marcel Kolaja
- Succeeded by: Maša Čorak; Koen de Voegt
- In office 18 April 2010 – 13 March 2011 Serving with Jerry Weyer
- Preceded by: Samir Allioui
- Succeeded by: Samir Allioui; Marcel Kolaja

Personal details
- Born: 1 November 1976 (age 49) Moscow, Russian SFSR
- Party: Pirate Party Germany
- Education: Goethe University Frankfurt

Grégory Engels (born 1 November 1976) is a German politician and activist. He has served three terms as Co-Chair of Pirate Parties International, and is also the Commissioner for International Cooperation within Pirate Party Germany.

== Early life and education ==
Engels was born in Moscow, Russia.

== Political career ==
=== Pirate Party Germany ===
Since 2009, Engels has been a member of Pirate Party Germany, and since November 2009 he has been the International Coordinator within the party. He is currently the Commissioner for International Cooperation.

Engels was elected to the Offenbach am Main city council representing the Pirate Party in the 2011 German local elections and re-elected in 2016. Engels in his first term served as the leader of the Pirate Party Germany group on the city council.

=== Pirate Parties International ===
Engels was elected as the first Co-Chair of Pirate Parties International in April 2010, alongside Luxembourgian Jerry Weyer. He continued in this role until the 2011 conference. Engels was re-elected as a Co-Chair in April 2012, this time serving alongside Russian Lola Voronina. Engels was re-elected for a third term in 2013, serving alongside Czech Vojtěch Pikal. This means Engels has served the longest uninterrupted tenure as Co-Chair of Pirate Parties International, which is two years.

From 2014 to 2015, Engels served as a Boardmember, and since July 2015, he has been an Alternate Boardmember, that can fill vacancies in the Board when they arise. In November 2019 he became Vice Chair.

== Personal life ==
Engels can speak English, German and Russian fluently. He is currently the CEO of Kompurity, a business partner of IBM.
