= Apparentment =

Party-list addition system in elections

Apparentment is the name given to the system, sometimes provided for in elections conducted according to the party-list proportional representation system, which allows parties to specify electoral alliances. The system has been used in Switzerland since 1919, and is also used in Israel and Denmark (local and European Parliament elections only).

Under list proportional representation, seats are awarded for each quota of votes obtained. Any votes excess to the quota are lost. Under apparentment, parties combine their vote excess, which may yield an additional full quota and candidate elected. For example, if there are 100 seats in the legislature, the quota per seat will be around 1%. If two parties poll 1.4 and 1.3 quotas respectively, they will probably only win one seat each if their votes are counted separately (assuming there is no further threshold, such as Germany's 5% barrier) but if they can combine their votes, they will have 2.7 quotas in total and a good chance of winning 3 seats overall. Usually the third seat would go to the party with 1.4% as it has more votes within the alliance.

There are two possible types of apparentment: different parties within a single electoral district combining their results, or the same party competing in different electoral districts combining these results. In the election of the German Constituent Assembly in the 1920s, an unused vote could be used outside the original district to help a party get an additional seat.

The system introduces an element of ordinality - a vote is first applied to elect a candidate or a party, then a group list. It is akin to a prespecified ranking in a preferential voting system like alternative vote or single transferable vote, as is used with the above-the-line system in Australian elections.

== Brazil ==
Elections in Brazil allowed for apparentments (Portuguese: Coligações) in proportional elections until the 2016 Brazilian municipal elections for city councillors and the 2018 Brazilian general election for federal deputies and state deputies, respectively. Under this system, two or more parties could pool not only their votes, but also their State-sponsored funds for political campaigning (Portuguese: Fundo Eleitoral) and their time quotas on radio and free-to-air television Party political broadcasts (Portuguese: Horário Eleitoral). However, such alliances were state based ones, leading to cases where two parties joined in an apparentment in a state being rivals in another state. During the 2010 Brazilian general election, despite supporting PT Dilma Rousseff bid to presidency in the national level, the PMDB party supported the candidacy of Geraldo Alckmin for Governor of São Paulo against PT candidate Aloizio Mercadante.

== Israel ==
In Israel, the electoral threshold determines how many votes a party needs to qualify for a seat. On occasion, after that number is calculated, a party does not receive a full Knesset seat. Parties can establish "surplus-vote agreements" to distribute their partial votes so that they are not wasted. The Bader-Ofer method, which lets two parties who have signed such an agreement be considered as a single list, was first used in the country in 1973, and is named after the MKs who introduced it, Yohanan Bader from Gahal and Avraham Ofer from Alignment.

== Netherlands ==
Dutch elections from 1973 to 2017 allowed for electoral alliances between two parties where both parties would nominate a combined party list. This practice, called the lijstverbinding, was abolished in June 2017 after being earlier abandoned for Senate elections.

In the Netherlands, seats in parliament are allocated by the D'Hondt method, a proportional representation method that tends to favor larger parties (see highest averages method). The lijstverbinding or kartel allowed two parties to pool their votes together when calculating representation, effectively treating them as a single, larger party when handing out seats.

Typically, the parties in a coalition are ideologically related. For example, in the PPR, PSP and CPN formed an apparentment. In the 2003 general elections, the Socialist Party and GreenLeft formed a lijstverbinding. In the 2004 European elections the social-democratic PvdA and GreenLeft formed a lijstverbinding. In 2012, GL, SP and PvdA joined forces while SP was excluded in 2017. The Orthodox Protestant Reformed Political Party (SGP) and Christian Union have also formed a lijstverbinding in the past and SGP, GPV and RPF before them.

== See also ==
- Electoral fusion
- Party-list proportional representation
