= Andrew Norton (Pirate Party) =

British roboticist, politician and researcher

Chairman of the US Pirate Party
- In office 28 January 2015 – 1 March 2016
- Preceded by: Lindsay-Anne Brunner
- Succeeded by: Joseph Klein
- In office May 2007 – September 2008
- Preceded by: Joshua Cowles
- Succeeded by: Glenn Kerbein

Chair of the Board, Pirate Party UK
- In office 28 January 2015 – 18 June 2015
- Preceded by: Jack Allnutt

Vice Chairman of the US Pirate Party
- In office November 2013 – January 2015
- Succeeded by: Lindsay-Anne Brunner

Coordinator of Pirate Parties International
- In office September 2008 – August 2009
- Preceded by: New position
- Succeeded by: Pat Mächler; Samir Allioui

Personal details
- Born: 24 June 1980 (age 46) Liverpool, England
- Education: University of Liverpool
- Website: http://ktetch.co.uk/

Andrew Norton (known also by his pseudonym "K`Tetch"; born 24 June 1980) is a British roboticist, politician and researcher. He is a former Coordinator of Pirate Parties International, a previous Chairman of the United States Pirate Party and a previous Chairman of the Board for Pirate Party UK.

== Early life and education ==
Norton was born in Liverpool, England. He was educated at Liverpool Blue Coat School from 1991 to 1998 and assisted as an IT technician for four years before studying Robotics at the University of Liverpool.

== Professional career ==
Using his knowledge of robotics, Norton took part in various robot combat competitions in the UK and the US, first as a competitor and later as a safety inspector. His team, Liverdyne Robotics, held the UK Middleweight title from 1998 to 2000. Norton helped run over 70 independent robot combat events around the UK from 1999 to 2003. He also appeared in series 3, 4, and 5 of British robot combat TV show Robot Wars. He also worked on several seasons of Comedy Central's BattleBots, as well as other small TV roles, including an appearance in Spaced both in front of and behind the camera.

In the late 1990s Norton worked as a commercial copyright enforcer for a London-based record label, however he resigned from this role in 1999 over protests with the industry response to Napster and MP3s.

Norton has been employed by the Dutch news website TorrentFreak for several years, and is their lead researcher and Community Manager. He is also currently a P2P systems researcher and was the assistant director of Electronic Frontier Forums, a series of lectures and panels given at Dragon Con each year, before becoming a segment producer and content creator for DragonConTV in 2017.

== Political career ==
Norton was introduced to politics in the late 1990s by current Leader of the Liberal Party, Steve Radford. He joined the Conservative Party, but left when he moved to the United States in 2003. In 2004 he worked on the election campaign for two Libertarian Party candidates for a state house seat in Washington state. However, the campaign was not a success.

Norton became part of the United States Pirate Party in October 2006 shortly after its founding, and was made International Coordinator. In March 2007, Norton became Chairman of the party and served in this role until September 2008, focusing on his expertise in copyright. In September 2008 he stepped down from Chairmanship to become the first Coordinator of the then-fledgling Pirate Parties International. He left this role in July 2009, handing the role over to a team of Pat Mächler and Samir Allioui. He has since criticised the direction of Pirate Parties International.

In 2011, Norton joined the Pirate Party UK as a member, and has worked as part of the press team since then. On 28 April 2013, he became a Governor of Pirate Party UK. On 28 January 2015, Norton became Chairman of the Board of Pirate Party UK.

He rejoined the Board of the US Pirate Party on 14 July 2010 as the party's Legal Officer. In November 2013 he became the Vice Chair of the US Pirate Party, continuing in this role until January 2015, when he resumed the role of Chairman, focusing on topics of accountability, privacy and activism. Since June 2013 he has also been the Vice Chair of the Georgia state Pirate Party.

== Notable incidents ==
In 2007, one of his first jobs for TorrentFreak was researching a claim that Comcast was interfering with the Bittorrent Protocol. He led a research team and discovered that Comcast was using a product called Sandvine to disrupt Bittorrent usage nationwide. Once this research was verified by the Associated Press and EFF it prompted an FCC investigation leading to the imposition of updated Net Neutrality rules.

In 2013, Norton responded to a consultation on collecting societies run by the UK Intellectual Property Office. His response prompted them to delay publication of the responses for 6 weeks, before redacting his response saying he "inappropriately criticised the activities of others in the sector" by providing links to news stories and court rulings, as the consultation had explicitly requested. The IPO later admitted overreach while emails obtained under a Freedom of Information Act request showed that such standards are not applied to larger respondents, only to individuals, for the purposes of amusement.

In 2014 Nominet changed their rules about domain name WHOIS information leading up to the launch of the .uk TLD. Norton, who has used the pseudonym "K`Tetch" since 1996 including on his domain WHOIS, fell foul of these new changes, which required all domains handled by Nominet to have their WHOIS information verified through government databases, or copies of photo ID submitted to Nominet, outraging many including Wikipedia co-founder Jimmy Wales. In discussions with the Guardian, Nominet also revealed their inconsistent stance on what constituted a commercial website. Nominet claims to have now changed their policies on what qualifies as a commercial site.

== Works ==
Norton was the editor of and contributor to No Safe Harbor, a collection of essays about Pirate politics. He is also an occasional contributor to publications such as TechDirt, ArsTechnica and SERVO Magazine. In April 2017, he announced his next book would focus on analysing the politics and philosophy of the Discworld universe.

=== Books ===
- No Safe Harbour: Essays About Pirate Politics (Multiple authors, CreateSpace Independent Publishing Platform: 2012), ISBN 1468033999
