= Massachusetts Pirate Party =

Political party in the United States

Massachusetts Pirates
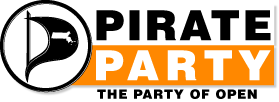
- Chairperson: James O'Keefe
- Founded: May 2010; 16 years ago
- Headquarters: Somerville, Massachusetts
- Ideology: Pirate politics Direct democracy
- Political position: Center-left
- National affiliation: United States Pirate Party
- International affiliation: Pirate Parties International
- Colors: Orange
- Seats in the Senate: 0 / 40
- Seats in the House: 0 / 160

Website
- MassPirates.org

The Massachusetts Pirate Party (MassPirates) is the Massachusetts affiliate of the United States Pirate Party and a political designation in Massachusetts officially recognized by the Secretary of the Commonwealth of Massachusetts. The Massachusetts Pirate Party was formed in May 2010 by James O’Keefe, Christine Reynolds and Erik Zoltan. They are active in promoting privacy, transparent government, and innovation by reining in copyright laws and eliminating patent laws. MassPirates ran candidates for State Representative in 2014 and 2016 and elected their first office holder in 2015.

== History ==
The MassPirates officially became registered as a non-party political designation in Massachusetts in 2011. Massachusetts was the first state to have a registered pirate party. In 2012, they ran the first pirate candidate, JP Hollembaek, in United States history. Hollembaek ran for state representative in the 16th Middlesex District. In 2014, MassPirates ran two candidates, Noelani Kamelamela for 27th Middlesex District and Joseph Guertin for 8th Worcester district. In 2015, then-party Quartermaster Steve Revilak became the first pirate in the United States to be elected to office, elected to Arlington town meeting. As of April 2021, Steve Revilak still serves on town hall. In 2016, Aaron James ran for 27th Middlesex District. In 2022, a party member ran an unsuccessful write in bid for the 4th Worcester district.

During the 2024 Massachusetts state elections, Joseph Onoroski, running in the 17th Middlesex District, set the record for the highest percentage of votes ever earned by a Pirate in a partisan race, as well as the best performance for a Pirate candidate in Massachusetts, earning 2663 votes and 22.2% of the vote.

== Platform ==
The Pirate Party takes its name from Internet piracy, sharing media online with peers without paying for it. James O’Keefe has said of the Pirate platform, "People shouldn't be going to jail because they're sharing files... Fundamentally, the Internet has changed the way we share culture and the way artists can be compensated, and we need to embrace those changes rather than stifling the innovation they create." Member Chris Walsh, in an interview with Martin Fredriksson of Linköping University, said "there will be no fixing copyright until you fix the underlying problem with the influence of money on politics" and blames the business model:

"The entertainment industry has this huge library of legal rights, and they can get a great return by lobbying to increase the value of those legal rights, so it's sort of a big part of their business model to spend money on lobbying to make your rights more valuable... The high-tech industry spends money on making new products, innovation and new services, while the entertainment... can get a great return by lobbying to increase the value of those legal rights"

—The Pirate Party and the Politics of Communication

The official party platform is laid out as:

- Putting People Before Corporations
- Opening up Government
- Defending Your Privacy
- Digital Freedom for Everyone!
- Promoting Culture & Knowledge Through Copyright Reform
- Fostering Innovation by Abolishing Patents
- Affirming Individual Autonomy
- Education for All
- Health Care is a Human Right!
- Freedom for Future Generations Requires a Sustainable & A Livable Future
- Addiction Policy
- Secure Livelihood
- Sex Worker Rights and Worker Rights
- Drug Policy
- Immigrants Welcome
- Reproductive Freedom Is A Human Right
- End Xenophobia!
- We Need True Decentralized Technologies
- Promoting Competition
- Art is for Everyone!
- Cash is the First P2P Service

== Pirate Council ==
=== Officers ===
- Captain – James O’Keefe
- First Officer – Steve Revilak
- Quartermaster – Joseph Onoroski
- Pr/media director – Elijah McGee
- Activism Director – Sam Capradae
- Swarmwise Director – Christine Reynolds
