= Democratic Political Turning Point =

Democratic Political Turning Point Democratisch Politiek Keerpunt
- Leader: Hero Brinkman
- Chairman: Theo Reijnen (Ad interim)
- Founder: Hero Brinkman
- Founded: 19 June 2012
- Dissolved: 18 November 2012
- Merger of: Proud of the Netherlands, Independent Citizens' Party
- Ideology: Conservative liberalism Classical liberalism Social conservatism Nationalism; Soft Euroscepticism; Populism
- Political position: Right-wing
- Colours: Red, White, Blue & Orange

Democratic Political Turning Point (DPK, Dutch: Democratisch Politiek Keerpunt) was a political party in the Netherlands. The party was founded by Hero Brinkman, an independent member of the House of Representatives, formerly a member of the Party for Freedom (PVV). After Brinkman left the Party for Freedom he founded the Independent Citizens' Party (OBP). On 9 June 2012, Brinkman announced that the Independent Citizens' Party was merging with the Proud of the Netherlands (TON) party to form a new party: Democratic Political Turning Point. The party participated in the Dutch general election of 2012, but did not win any seats. On 18 November 2012, TON reversed the merger and parted ways with Brinkman.
