= Samir Allioui =

Dutch politician and activist

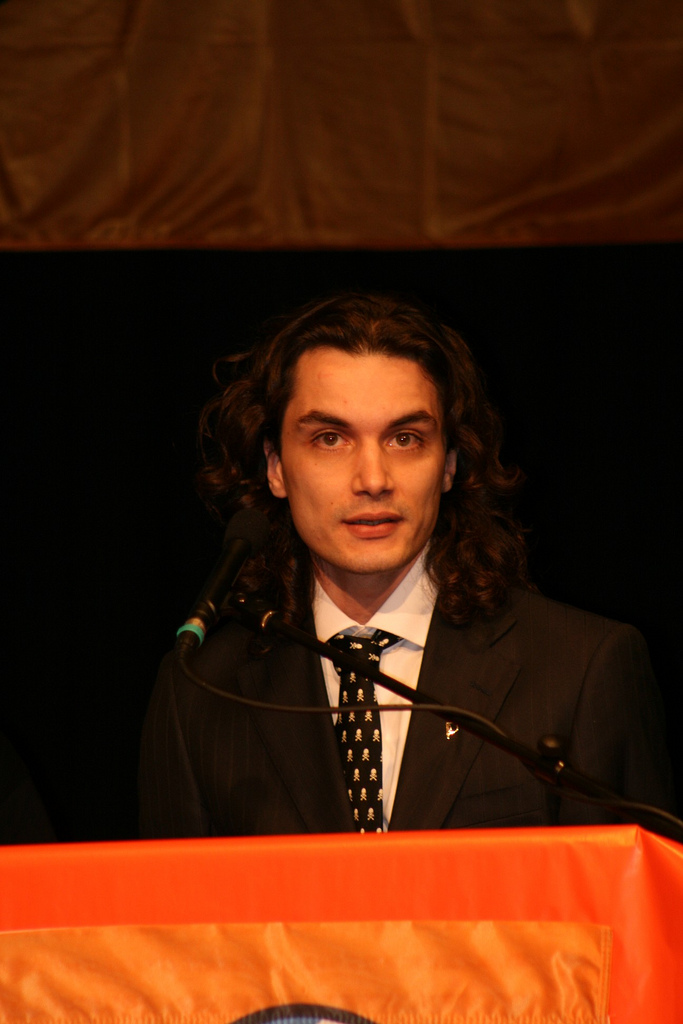
- Allioui in August 2009.

Co-Chair of Pirate Parties International
- In office 13 March 2011 – 15 April 2012 Serving with Marcel Kolaja
- Preceded by: Grégory Engels; Jerry Weyer
- Succeeded by: Grégory Engels; Lola Voronina
- In office August 2009 – 18 April 2010 Serving with Pat Mächler
- Preceded by: Andrew Norton
- Succeeded by: Grégory Engels; Jerry Weyer

Personal details
- Born: 1983 (age 42–43)
- Party: Pirate Party of the Netherlands
- Education: Windesheim University of Applied Sciences

Samir Allioui (born 1983) is a Dutch politician and activist. From August 2009 to April 2010, Allioui served as the Co-President of Pirate Parties International, firstly with Pat Mächler and later with Jerry Weyer. He was later elected a Co-Chair of Pirate Parties International, serving from March 2011 to April 2012. Allioui was also the lijsttrekker for the Pirate Party of the Netherlands during the 2010 Dutch general election.

== Early life and education ==
Allioui was born in Amsterdam to a Moroccan father. His mother was 16 when she gave birth to him, and Allioui ended up spending time in several different orphanages. However, he spent most of his childhood with foster parents in Zoetermeer. Allioui also lived in the Hague for a few years, which was when his 16-year-old sister was killed in the house when he was not home. Five years after her death, he tracked down the perpetrator using his computer skills, who was then prosecuted by the police. Allioui was complimented by the judge for his efforts.

Allioui became very interested in computing, particularly coding and writing script at school. After he finished school, he spent a short time in the Dutch Army, and a year as a programmer at a marketing consultancy, before studying Business Information Technology at Windesheim University of Applied Sciences.

== Political career ==
=== Pirate Parties International ===
Allioui, alongside Pat Mächler, became joint Co-Presidents in charge of the 'Coreteam' of Pirate Parties International (PPI) in August 2009, following the resignation of sole coordinator Andrew Norton on 2 August. Allioui served in this role until the 2010 founding conference of the PPI on 18 April 2010. Mächler stepped down on 1 March 2010, shortly before the conference, which meant that between the Mächler stepping down and the conference, his role was filled by Jerry Weyer. During the conference, Weyer and Grégory Engels were elected the first Co-Chairs of the PPI.

Allioui was re-elected as a Co-Chair of Pirate Parties International during their 2011 conference in Friedrichshafen, Germany. He was elected alongside Marcel Kolaja and served from 13 March 2011 until the next conference which ended on 15 April 2012.

Allioui was described by Andrew Norton as "a constant and outspoken critic of the PPI Board".

=== Pirate Party of the Netherlands ===
Allioui is a co-founder of the Pirate Party of the Netherlands, and also served as their informal leader, notably during the 2010 Dutch general election, where he was the lijsttrekker for the Pirate Party. Allioui was the lijstduwer for the Pirate Party in the 2012 Dutch general election.
