= Socialist Party of Massachusetts =

Massachusetts political party

- Senate leader: None
- House leader: None
- Founded: 1970s
- Ideology: Democratic socialism
- Colors: Red
- Seats in the Upper House: 0 / 40
- Seats in the Lower House: 0 / 160

Website
- socialistparty-usa.org/mass/aboutus.htm

The Socialist Party of Massachusetts (SPMA) is a democratic socialist political party in the U.S. state of Massachusetts. Since the 1970s, it has been the state chapter of the Socialist Party USA (SPUSA), after previously having been affiliated with the Socialist Party of America.

It was re-organized in the 1970s, after the formation of the SPUSA by activists who had been members of the much larger Socialist Party of America. In 1993, SPMA activists were able to establish "Socialist" as an official political designation, the culmination of a campaign started in 1986.

The Socialist Party of Massachusetts engages in both electoral politics and non-electoral activism. Electoral activities include Eric Chester's campaign for the United States House of Representatives and support for ballot questions on instant run-off voting, proportional representation, and public finance of elections. Non-electoral activism includes support for unions and unionization (often in cooperation with the Industrial Workers of the World), anti-war and anti-imperialist agitation (including annual public Anti-Imperialist Fourth of July Picnics), and support for feminism and women's rights (including annual demonstrations to mark Rosie Jimenez Day, October 3).

The Socialist Party of Massachusetts has one chartered local, in the Boston area.

== Notable members ==
- James F. Carey (1867–1938) Haverhill City Council member and state legislator
- John C. Chase (1870–1937) Mayor of Haverhill, Massachusetts and first elected socialist mayor in U.S. history
- Eric Chester (born 1943) Socialist Party USA 1996 vice-presidential nominee
- Adolph Germer (1881–1966) SPMA state secretary and national secretary of Socialist Party of America
- Helen Keller (1880–1968) SPMA member from 1909-1921
- Ellen Hayes (1851–1930) SPMA candidate for Secretary of State in 1912, first woman to run for statewide office in state history
