= 2012 Dutch general election =

Election of the members of the House of Representatives

- 12 September 2012
- All 150 seats in the House of Representatives; 76 seats needed for a majority
- Turnout: 74.6% (▼0.8 pp)
Party	Leader	Vote %	Seats	+/–
VVD	Mark Rutte	26.58	41	+10
PvdA	Diederik Samsom	24.84	38	+8
PVV	Geert Wilders	10.08	15	−9
SP	Emile Roemer	9.65	15	0
CDA	Sybrand van Haersma Buma	8.51	13	−8
D66	Alexander Pechtold	8.03	12	+2
CU	Arie Slob	3.13	5	0
GL	Jolande Sap	2.33	4	−6
SGP	Kees van der Staaij	2.09	3	+1
PvdD	Marianne Thieme	1.93	2	0
50+	Henk Krol	1.88	2	New
This lists parties that won seats. See the complete results below.
Strongest political party by municipality
Cabinet before	Cabinet after
First Rutte cabinet VVD–CDA	Second Rutte cabinet VVD–PvdA

Early general elections were held in the Netherlands on 12 September 2012 after Prime Minister Mark Rutte handed in his government's resignation to Queen Beatrix on 23 April. The 150 seats of the House of Representatives were contested using party-list proportional representation. The People's Party for Freedom and Democracy (VVD) received a plurality of the votes, followed by the Labour Party (PvdA).

Prior to the election, polls had predicted an increase in support for the Socialist Party, primarily at the expense of the PvdA, but the PvdA regained support during the campaign, which was attributed to the leadership of Diederik Samsom and in the election the Socialist Party failed to improve its performance. The Party for Freedom (PVV) and Christian Democratic Appeal (CDA) both lost seats.

After 49 days of negotiations, a new VVD-PvdA centrist government was formed on 5 November 2012, comprising Mark Rutte as prime minister along with 7 VVD ministers and 6 PvdA ministers.

It was the first Netherlands-wide election in which the Caribbean Netherlands participated.

== Background ==
Prime Minister Mark Rutte's government fell after the Party for Freedom (PVV), which had supported the government from outside, refused to sanction the austerity measures the government sought in April 2012. This called for a new early election to be held in September 2012. It is the fourth early election in a row since the Second Kok cabinet fell very near the end of its mandate, which allowed that government to keep the election date to be held as scheduled by the term in May 2002. Early elections were subsequently held in January 2003, November 2006, June 2010 and September 2012. And during that time a total of five governments ended prematurely, as it was possible for the Third Balkenende cabinet (July–November 2006) to be formed without a new election.

== Participating parties ==
In addition to the established parties of Dutch politics, the pensioners' party 50PLUS, founded in 2009, won its first seats in the election.

The Pirate Party claimed that it may enter parliament for the first time with 2 or 3 seats. However, the party achieved only 0.3% of the national vote and no seats.

Hero Brinkman, elected on the Party for Freedom's list, split from the party in March 2012 and founded the Independent Citizens' Party in April 2012 to run in the election on his own. In June 2012, the party merged with Proud of the Netherlands (a party founded by Rita Verdonk, who had resigned from the position of party leader) to form the Democratic Political Turning Point, with Brinkman as leader. The party achieved 0.1% of the national vote and no seats.

List	Party	Abbreviation	Leader	Details
1	People's Party for Freedom and Democracy (Volkspartij voor Vrijheid en Democratie)	VVD	Mark Rutte	
2	Labour Party (Partij van de Arbeid)	PvdA	Diederik Samsom	Apparentment with GL and SP
3	Party for Freedom (Partij voor de Vrijheid)	PVV	Geert Wilders	
4	Christian Democratic Appeal (Christen-Democratisch Appèl)	CDA	Sybrand van Haersma Buma	
5	Socialist Party (Socialistische Partij)	SP	Emile Roemer	Apparentment with GL and PvdA
6	Democrats 66 (Democraten 66)	D66	Alexander Pechtold	
7	GreenLeft (GroenLinks)	GL	Jolande Sap	Apparentment with PvdA and SP
8	ChristianUnion (ChristenUnie)	CU	Arie Slob	Apparentment with SGP
9	Reformed Political Party (Staatkundig Gereformeerde Partij)	SGP	Kees van der Staaij	Apparentment with CU
10	Party for the Animals (Partij voor de Dieren)	PvdD	Marianne Thieme	
11	Pirate Party (Piratenpartij)	PPNL	Dirk Poot	
12	Party for Human and Spirit (Partij voor Mens en Spirit)	MenS	Lea Manders	Participate in all constituencies, except for the BES islands
13	Netherlands Local (Nederland Lokaal)	NL	Ton Schijvenaars	
14	Libertarian Party (Libertarische Partij)	LP	Toine Manders	
15	Democratic Political Turning Point (Democratisch Politiek Keerpunt)	DPK	Hero Brinkman	Merger of Trots with OBP
16	50PLUS	50+	Henk Krol	
17	Liberal Democratic Party (Liberaal Democratische Partij)	LibDem	Sammy van Tuyll van Serooskerken	Participate in all constituencies, except for the BES islands
18	Anti-Europe Party (Anti Europa Partij)	AeuP	Arnold Reinten	
19	Sovereign Independent Pioneers Netherlands (Soeverein Onafhankelijke Pioniers Nederland)	SOPN	Johan Oldenkamp	Participate in all constituencies, except for the BES islands
20	Party of the Future (Partij van de Toekomst)	PvdT	Johan Vlemmix	Participate in all constituencies, except for the BES islands
21	Political Party NXD (Politieke Partij NXD)		Anil Samlal	Participate only in constituency 9

== Polls ==
Date	Polling firm	VVD	PvdA	PVV	CDA	SP	D66	GL	CU	SGP	PvdD	50 Plus	Pirate
9 June 2010	2010 Election	20.4% (31)	19.6% (30)	15.5% (24)	13.7% (21)	9.9% (15)	6.9% (10)	6.6% (10)	3.3% (5)	1.7% (2)	1.3% (2)	– (0)	0.1% (0)
22 March 2012	Ipsos; Neth.	22.1% (34)	16.8% (26)	13.9% (21)	9.4% (14)	16.8% (26)	7.7% (11)	4.5% (7)	3.3% (5)	1.5% (2)	2.4% (4)	1.1% (1)	—N/a
5 April 2012	Ipsos; Neth.	23.6% (36)	17.1% (26)	13.3% (20)	8.8% (13)	16.3% (25)	8.7% (13)	4.1% (6)	3.2% (5)	1.4% (2)	2.0% (3)	0.8% (1)	—N/a
19 April 2012	Ipsos; Neth.	24.0% (37)	17.3% (27)	12.0% (18)	8.2% (12)	17.0% (26)	8.8% (13)	3.5% (5)	3.3% (5)	1.6% (2)	3.1% (4)	0.8% (1)	—N/a
27 April 2012	Ipsos; Neth.	22.4% (34)	16.5% (25)	12.1% (18)	8.4% (13)	17.2% (26)	10.6% (16)	3.3% (5)	4.0% (6)	1.7% (2)	2.2% (3)	0.8% (1)	—N/a
5 May 2012	Ipsos; Neth.	22.9% (35)	14.7% (23)	11.4% (17)	9.0% (14)	18.5% (28)	10.1% (15)	4.1% (6)	3.6% (5)	1.4% (2)	2.9% (4)	0.8% (1)	—N/a
12 May 2012	Ipsos; Neth.	21.4% (33)	14.5% (22)	12.7% (19)	10.3% (16)	18.5% (28)	9.9% (15)	3.8% (5)	3.9% (6)	1.3% (2)	2.5% (3)	0.8% (0)	—N/a
18 May 2012	Ipsos; Neth.	20.1% (31)	16.0% (24)	13.8% (21)	10.7% (16)	17.3% (27)	9.8% (15)	3.8% (5)	3.4% (5)	1.4% (2)	2.5% (3)	0.7% (0)	—N/a
25 May 2012	Ipsos; Neth.	19.8% (30)	16.2% (25)	13.4% (20)	10.3% (16)	17.5% (27)	10.3% (16)	3.8% (5)	3.7% (5)	1.4% (2)	2.3% (3)	0.8% (1)	—N/a
2 June 2012	Ipsos; Neth.	21.0% (32)	15.3% (24)	14.1% (22)	9.4% (14)	17.6% (27)	9.7% (15)	3.7% (5)	3.4% (5)	1.6% (2)	2.3% (3)	0.8% (1)	—N/a
15 June 2012	Ipsos; Neth.	22.3% (34)	15.5% (24)	15.3% (23)	8.0% (12)	16.6% (25)	9.6% (15)	3.3% (5)	4.0% (6)	1.4% (2)	2.1% (3)	0.7% (1)	—N/a
29 June 2012	Ipsos; Neth.	20.8% (32)	15.1% (23)	13.1% (20)	9.4% (14)	18.3% (28)	9.3% (14)	3.2% (5)	4.5% (7)	2.1% (3)	2.3% (3)	0.9% (1)	—N/a
6 July 2012	Ipsos; Neth.	23.0% (35)	16.0% (25)	11.9% (18)	9.4% (14)	18.8% (29)	8.7% (13)	2.7% (4)	3.9% (6)	1.6% (2)	2.4% (3)	0.8% (1)	—N/a
13 July 2012	Ipsos; Neth.	23.3% (36)	14.7% (23)	12.4% (19)	10.5% (16)	17.8% (27)	8.3% (13)	3.6% (5)	3.6% (5)	1.6% (2)	2.3% (3)	0.8% (1)	—N/a
27 July 2012	Ipsos; Neth.	22.2% (35)	14.9% (23)	11.9% (18)	9.5% (15)	18.8% (29)	9.4% (14)	3.1% (4)	4.5% (6)	1.5% (2)	1.9% (3)	1.2% (1)	—N/a
10 August 2012	Ipsos; Neth.	21.0% (32)	14.3% (22)	12.6% (19)	9.6% (15)	19.8% (31)	10.2% (15)	2.6% (4)	4.2% (6)	1.4% (2)	2.5% (3)	1.2% (1)	—N/a
17 August 2012	Ipsos; Neth.	22.7% (35)	14.9% (23)	11.9% (18)	9.0% (14)	18.4% (29)	9.5% (14)	2.7% (4)	3.4% (5)	2.0% (3)	2.5% (3)	1.4% (2)	—N/a
24 August 2012	Ipsos; Neth.	22.1% (34)	14.0% (22)	12.4% (19)	9.3% (14)	19.8% (30)	9.5% (14)	3.4% (5)	3.9% (6)	1.6% (2)	2.0% (3)	1.1% (1)	—N/a
31 August 2012	Ipsos; Neth.	22.1% (34)	16.6% (26)	13.2% (20)	8.9% (13)	17.1% (27)	9.2% (14)	2.9% (4)	3.5% (5)	1.5% (2)	2.6% (4)	1.0% (1)	—N/a
3 September 2012	Ipsos; Neth.	22.7% (35)	19.3% (30)	11.7% (18)	9.0% (14)	15.4% (24)	9.5% (14)	1.7% (3)	3.1% (4)	1.3% (2)	3.0% (4)	1.8% (2)	—N/a
5 September 2012	Ipsos; Neth.	21.6% (34)	20.5% (32)	13.3% (20)	8.0% (12)	14.2% (22)	8.3% (13)	2.7% (4)	4.1% (6)	1.6% (2)	2.2% (3)	1.8% (2)	0.6% (0)
8 September 2012	Ipsos; Neth.	22.5% (35)	22.7% (35)	12.3% (19)	8.4% (13)	13.4% (21)	7.7% (11)	2.9% (4)	4.2% (6)	1.5% (2)	2.2% (3)	0.7% (1)	0.6% (0)
11 September 2012	Ipsos; Neth.	24.3 (37)	23.4 (36)	11.4% (17)	8.8% (13)	13.4% (21)	6.7% (10)	2.3% (4)	3.7% (5)	1.2% (2)	2.1% (3)	1.5% (2)	0.3% (0)
Date	Polling firm	VVD	PvdA	PVV	CDA	SP	D66	GL	CU	SGP	PvdD	50 Plus	Pirate

Natixis evaluated on 6 September the most recent opinion polls, and found the likelihood was strongest for the formation of a "purple government" of the pro-EU parties: VVD, CDA, D66, PvdA and, possible GL. It also pointed to other potential governing coalition that would include a pro-austerity government with VVD, CDA, D66, GL and CU; or a centre-left government of CDA, D66, GL and PvdA with a minority of seats, but with outside parliamentary support of the SP. The two largest eurosceptic parties, PVV and SP, are reportedly not interested in building a coalition. A similar scenario to the previous election could re-occur, considering no pre-election alliance will receive votes enough for majority, and thus needs to form a new more broad coalition government, comprising at least three parties.

== Pre-election agreements ==
On 27 April, the two governing coalition parties, VVD and CDA negotiated a deal to reduce the national deficit in 2013 to an acceptable level below 3% of GDP. This deal was also supported by the three opposition parties: D66, GL and the CU.

A ratification of the newly signed Fiscal Compact is unconditionally supported by the four parties: VVD, CDA, D66 and GL. The compact is however opposed by the three parties: PVV, CU and SP, while the PvdA, will only support it provided that the European Commission first grant the Netherlands a two-year exemption to comply, due to the existence of "extraordinary economic circumstances."

== Campaign ==
The VVD's Mark Rutte is said to be aligned with German Chancellor Angela Merkel in promoting austerity measures, while his closest rival the PvdA's Diederik Samsom's was said to reflect French President Francois Hollande's stimulus measures from its own election this year. A final television debate took place on 11 September, with the economy reportedly the most important issue amongst voters. The day before the debate, Rutte said that he would stop delegating ever increasing powers to the European Union saying: "I am 'Mr No' when it comes to a Brussels that's expanding more and more." Conversely, Samsom said that he was in coordination with Hollande over dealing with the economic crisis. Support for him and the PvdA grew after he was perceived as having the better performance in the debates. He also rejected taking cabinet posts in a coalition government saying: "I will either be prime minister, or I will lead my party in parliament." The vote was also seen as a test of the EU's popularity within the country.

Political analyst Anno Bunnik said that many voters were not keen on repeated early elections. He also pointed to PVV's Geert Wilders' declining popularity after he was viewed as a political opportunist not looking out for the national interest in effectively forcing a snap election. In citing Wilders' labeling as a "sorcerer's apprentice," he also pointed to a possible first-ever loss of seats for the PVV under Wilder's helm. He attributed this to Wilders' inefficiency in the debates of responding to the other party leaders instead of setting the agenda, instead in one debate he got into an argument with Rutte with both leaders calling each other liars in an unprecedented move.

Though opinion polls indicated a close race to gain a majority, the international media indicated a left-leaning government was likely to emerge as a result of the election. However, the French election was cited and countered as a turn in orientation for the government would still not lead to a change in austerity policies.

== Results ==
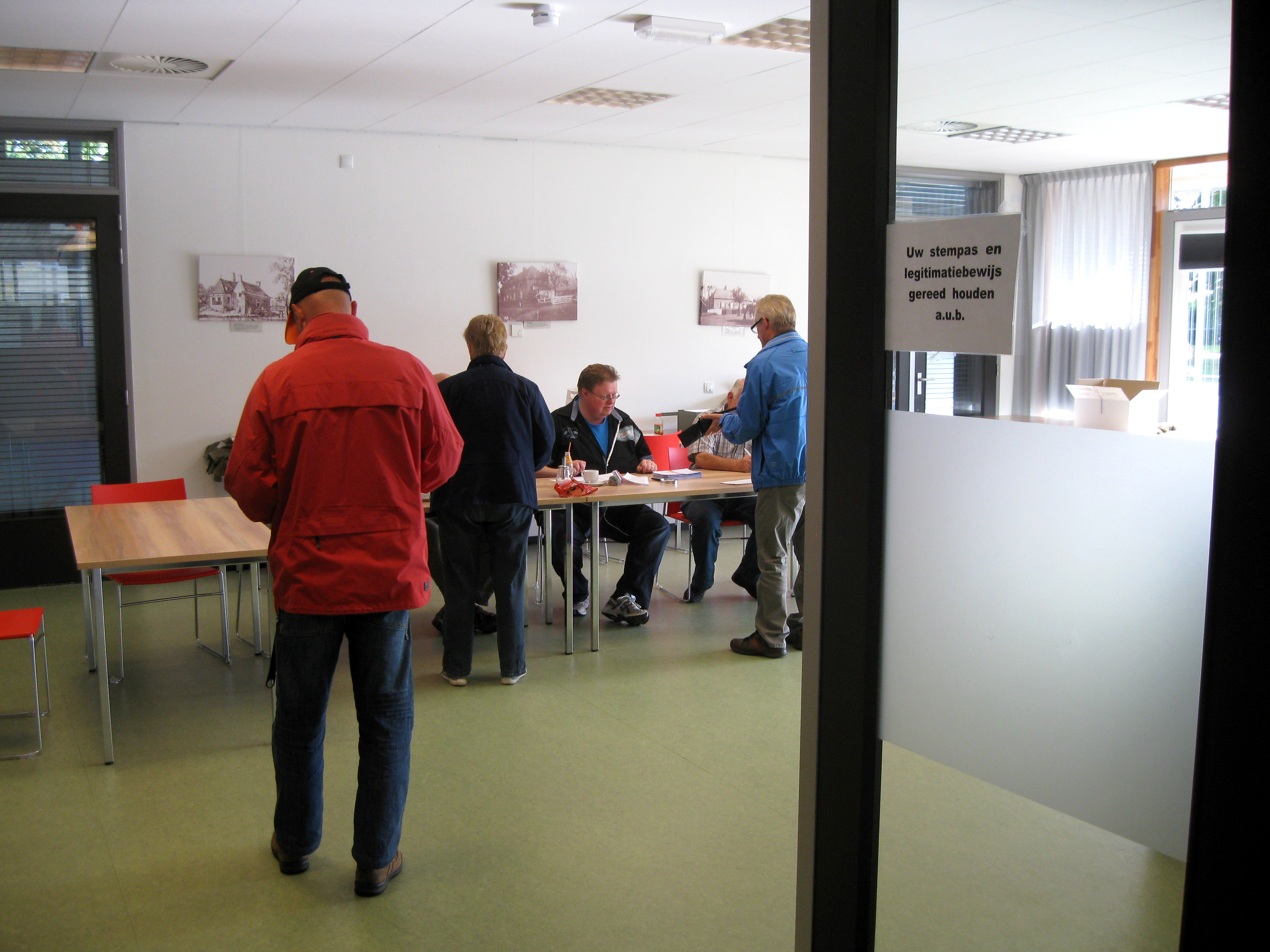
Polling station in Silvolde, Gelderland

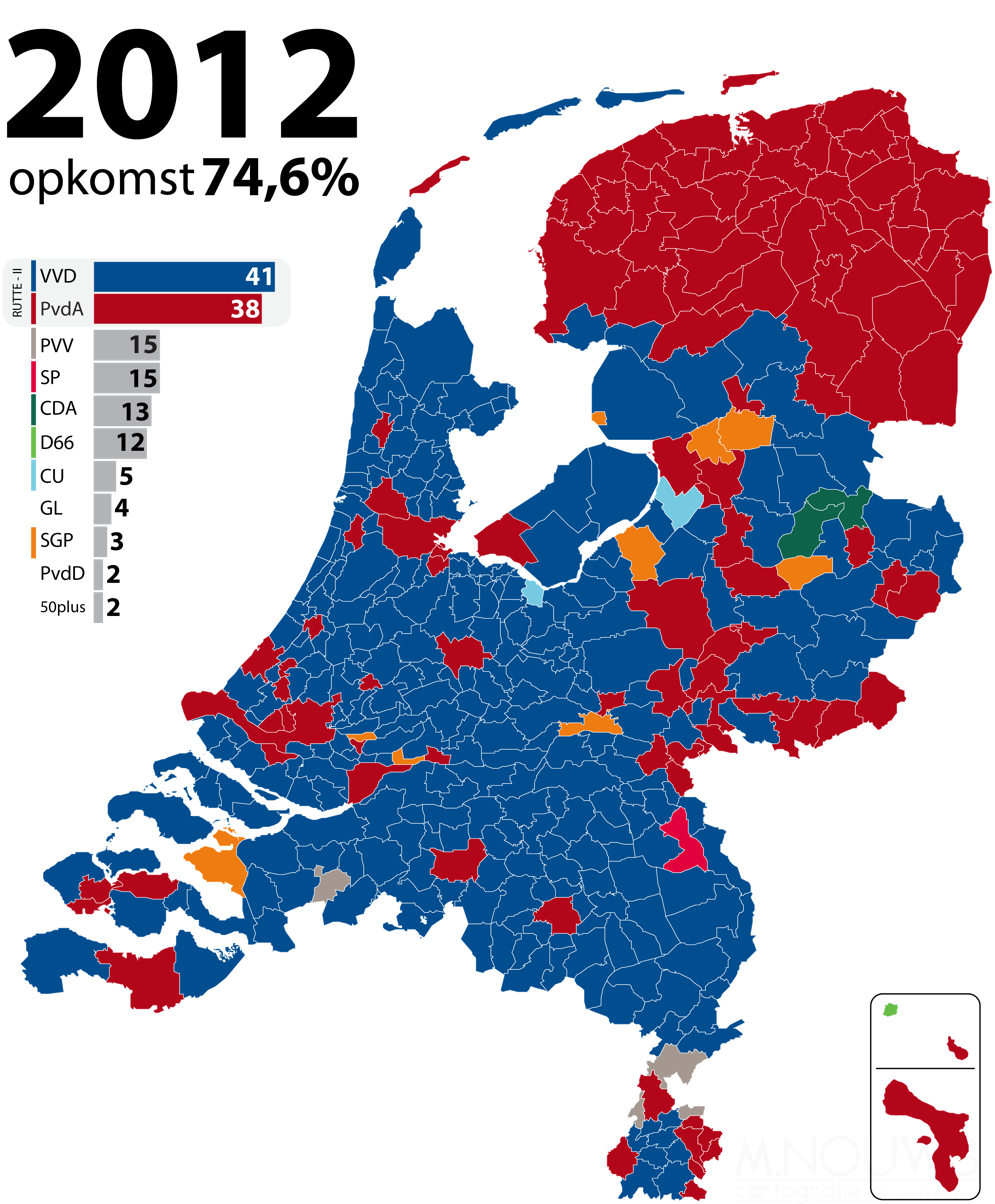
The largest party in each municipality

There was a turn-out of 74.6%, about one percent less than the previous election two years before. The NOS reported the following results after 100% of the votes were counted:

- The VVD won the most votes (26.6%), accruing 41 seats (an increase of 10).
- The PvdA was second (24.8%), accruing 38 seats (an increase of 8).
- The PVV was third (10.1%), with 15 seats (a loss of nine, down from 24 seats), and obtained the same number of seats as the SP (15).
- The GL lost six of its ten seats and just under two-thirds of their voters.

The Kiesraad announced the final results on 17 September.

Party	Votes	%	Seats	+/–
People's Party for Freedom and Democracy	2,504,948	26.58	41	+10
Labour Party	2,340,750	24.84	38	+8
Party for Freedom	950,263	10.08	15	–9
Socialist Party	909,853	9.65	15	0
Christian Democratic Appeal	801,620	8.51	13	–8
Democrats 66	757,091	8.03	12	+2
Christian Union	294,586	3.13	5	0
GroenLinks	219,896	2.33	4	–6
Reformed Political Party	196,780	2.09	3	+1
Party for the Animals	182,162	1.93	2	0
50PLUS	177,631	1.88	2	New
Pirate Party	30,600	0.32	0	0
Party for Human and Spirit	18,310	0.19	0	0
Sovereign Independent Pioneers Netherlands	12,982	0.14	0	New
Party of the Future	8,194	0.09	0	New
Democratic Political Turning Point	7,363	0.08	0	New
Libertarian Party	4,163	0.04	0	New
Netherlands Local	2,842	0.03	0	New
Liberal Democratic Party	2,126	0.02	0	New
Anti-Europe Party	2,013	0.02	0	New
Political Party NXD	62	0.00	0	New
Total	9,424,235	100.00	150	0
Valid votes	9,424,235	99.60		
Invalid/blank votes	37,988	0.40		
Total votes	9,462,223	100.00		
Registered voters/turnout	12,689,810	74.57		
Source: Kiesraad

=== By province ===
Results by province
Province	VVD	PvdA	PVV	SP	CDA	D66	CU	GL	SGP	PvdD	50+	Others
Drenthe	23.7	32.8	8.3	9.1	9.8	5.9	4.2	1.8	0.7	1.5	1.4	0.8
Flevoland	28.7	23.3	12.4	8.3	6.4	5.8	4.6	1.7	3.6	2.0	2.1	1.1
Friesland	19.9	33.1	7.3	9.5	13.8	5.1	4.9	1.7	0.9	1.6	1.1	1.1
Gelderland	25.7	24.3	8.6	9.6	9.6	7.6	4.1	2.4	4.0	1.7	1.6	0.8
Groningen	17.1	35.3	7.1	11.7	7.7	7.6	5.8	2.8	0.7	2.0	1.2	1.0
Limburg	22.7	21.8	17.7	14.4	9.7	6.3	0.5	1.8	0.1	1.8	2.2	1.0
North Brabant	28.8	21.5	11.0	13.8	9.1	7.8	0.9	1.8	0.5	1.6	2.4	0.8
North Holland	29.3	27.0	8.7	8.4	5.6	10.3	1.4	3.1	0.3	2.6	2.2	1.1
Overijssel	23.1	24.7	8.1	9.3	13.7	6.6	6.2	1.7	3.0	1.3	1.5	0.8
South Holland	28.3	23.5	11.6	7.5	7.0	8.2	3.5	2.2	3.2	2.2	2.0	0.8
Utrecht	29.6	22.5	7.9	6.6	7.4	10.9	4.4	3.6	2.7	1.9	1.6	0.9
Zeeland	24.2	22.7	10.0	9.1	9.6	4.9	4.2	1.6	9.5	1.8	1.6	0.8
Caribbean Netherlands	18.2	24.0	2.8	7.5	16.3	16.7	4.4	2.6	0.4	2.4	2.0	2.7

== See also ==
- List of members of the House of Representatives of the Netherlands, 2012–2017
- 2012 Dutch cabinet formation
