= Libertarian Party (Netherlands) =

Libertarian Party Libertaire Partij
- Abbreviation: LP
- Leader: Tom van Lamoen
- Chairperson: Emma van Zoelen
- Secretary: Rody Mens
- Founders: Barthold van Doorn; Hub Jongen; Stefan van Glabbeek
- Founded: 20 October 1993; 32 years ago
- Headquarters: The Hague, Netherlands
- Newspaper: Leef je uit!
- Youth wing: Young Libertarians
- Think tank: Bernard de Mandeville Institute
- Ideology: Libertarianism; Euroscepticism
- Political position: Right-wing
- International affiliation: International Alliance of Libertarian Parties
- Colours: Blue
- Slogan: "The government is the problem, not the solution!"
- Senate: 0 / 75
- House of Representatives: 0 / 150
- European Parliament: 0 / 31
- States Provincial: 0 / 570
- Municipal councils: 0 / 8,462

Website
- stemLP.nl

The Libertarian Party (Dutch: Libertaire Partij, also Libertarische Partij before 2019; LP) is a libertarian political party in the Netherlands founded in 1993.

It intends to develop "a free world, a world in which no one is forced to sacrifice his or her life and property for the benefit of others". The party's inaugural leader and chairman was the controversial jurist and tax consultant Toine Manders.

== History ==
=== Founding ===
The LP was founded as the Libertarische Partij in 1993 by Barthold van Doorn, Hub Jongen, and Stefan van Glabbeek. They sympathized with the Libertarian Centre Netherlands, founded in the 1970s, and were very involved in the libertarian magazine de Vrijbrief. The trio found the necessary help through that medium to start the party. In forming it, they were mainly inspired by the Libertarian Party of the United States.

=== Representation ===
The LP has participated in a total of nine Dutch general and local elections between 1994 and 2025, but it has yet to win official representation.

==== General elections ====
The Libertarian Party took part in the general election of 1994, receiving only 2,754 votes and no seats. After this, the party spent nearly two decades in 'hibernation', organizing lectures and events to spread its message, but not partaking in national elections. It was reactivated in 2012, and participated in the general elections of 2012 and 2017, receiving 4,205 and 1,492 votes, respectively. It again failed to win any seats in the general election of 2021, when it received 5,608 votes. In the general election of 2023, the party won 4,129 votes, again not enough for a seat.

==== Provincial and municipal elections ====
The LP has participated in local elections in thirteen municipalities in 2014 and 2018. In 2014, it was the first political party in the Netherlands to accept Bitcoin. The party also participated in the provincial elections of 2015.

=== LP elects in other parties ===
In addition to electoral participation for the Libertarian Party, a number of members have won representation for other parties. For example, LP member Stefanie Vulders was also a member of the municipal council faction of Progressive Oisterwijk in Oisterwijk, until she split due to substantive differences of opinion. This seat was lost in the redistricting elections in November 2020, when Vulders and her newly founded party WIJ! Oisterwijk failed to obtain any seats. In Rijswijk, LP member Romy de Man was faction leader of Independent Rijswijk, but this party did not participate in the 2022 municipal elections. During the redistricting elections in Haarlemmermeer in 2018, LP member Erik Vermeulen from Zwanenburg was elected councilor on behalf of local party Forza! Haarlemmermeer. In the 2022 elections, Vermeulen was lead candidate on behalf of that party and faction leader after those elections. Also in the 2022 elections, Tom van Lamoen was elected to the Amersfoort municipal council for the local party Amersfoort for Freedom.

== Ideology ==
=== Positions ===
- A negative income tax
- More autonomy for provinces and municipalities

== Electoral results ==
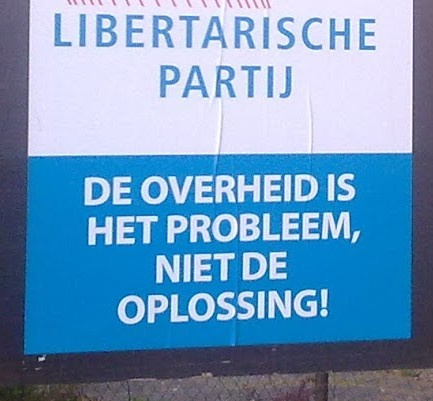
"The government is the problem, not the solution!" Winschoten, 2012

=== House of Representatives ===
Year	Lead candidate	List	Votes	%	Seats	+/–	Government
1994	Toine Manders	List	2,754	0.03%	0 / 150	New	Extra-parliamentary
2012	Toine Manders	List	4,163	0.04%	0 / 150	0	Extra-parliamentary
2017	Robert Valentine	List	1,492	0.01%	0 / 150	0	Extra-parliamentary
2021	Robert Valentine	List	5,546	0.05%	0 / 150	0	Extra-parliamentary
2023	Tom van Lamoen	List	4,152	0.04%	0 / 150	0	Extra-parliamentary
2025	Tom van Lamoen	List	8,248	0.08%	0 / 150	0	Extra-parliamentary

== Leadership ==
- Party leaders
  - Toine Manders (1994–2014)
  - Robert Valentine (May 2016 – June 2021)
  - Tom van Lamoen
- Party chairs
  - Toine Manders (1994–2014)
  - Robert Valentine (May 2016 – 12 June 2021)
  - Paul Schreurs (12 June 2021 – 18 June 2022)
  - Emma van Zoelen (since 18 June 2022)
- Party secretaries
  - Robert Valentine (May 2015 – April 2016)
  - Tom Wentzel
  - Rik Kleinsmit
  - Rody Mens

== Membership ==
The LP's membership has grown significantly since 2012, increasing from 27 in April 2012 to c. 550 in the third quarter of 2021.

=== Honorary members ===
Two honorary members were appointed at the 7 July 2012 congress for helping to continue the party during its 'hibernation' from 1994 to 2012.

- Paul Schreurs
- Otto Vrijhof

== Structure ==
The party has a board, standing committees and working groups, municipal departments and a scientific bureau, the Bernard de Mandeville Institute. Internationally, the party is part of the European Party for Individual Liberty (EPIL) and the International Alliance of Libertarian Parties (IALP). Since 1 November 2016, the party has had an official youth wing, the 'Young Libertarians' (Jonge Libertariërs).

== Notable supporters ==
Publicist and financial analyst Willem Middelkoop gave voting advice in a tweet in 2012 to vote for the LP in the elections. In the 2014 municipal elections, MEP Daniël van der Stoep, from the Article 50 party, advised people to vote for the Libertarian Party wherever possible. Author Arno Wellens was the lijstduwer for the party in the 2021 general election.

== See also ==
- List of political parties in the Netherlands
- Right-libertarianism
