= United States Pirate Party =

American political party

- Abbreviation: USPP
- Captain: Jolly Mitch (IL)
- Founded: June 6, 2006; 20 years ago
- Youth wing: Young Pirates USA
- Ideology: Pirate politics; Civil libertarianism; Direct democracy; Pan-Americanism Georgism; Police reform
- Political position: Syncretic
- National affiliation: All Hands for a Free Future
- International affiliation: Pirate Parties International (2023-2026)
- Colors: Purple; Blue; Red
- Seats in the Senate: 0 / 100
- Seats in the House: 0 / 435
- Governorships: 0 / 50
- State Upper Houses: 0 / 1,921
- State Lower Houses: 0 / 5,410
- Other elected officials: 2

Website
- uspirates.org

The United States Pirate Party (USPP) is an American political party founded in 2006 by Brent Allison and Alex English. The party's platform is aligned with the global Pirate movement, and supports reform of copyright laws to reflect open source and free culture values, government transparency, protection of privacy and civil liberties. The United States Pirate Party also advocates for evidence-based policy, egalitarianism, meritocracy and the hacker ethic as well as the rolling back of corporate personhood and corporate welfare. The USPP has also made a priority to advocate for changes in the copyright laws and removal of patents. It is the belief of the party that these restrictions greatly hinder the sharing and expansion of knowledge and resources.

The party's national organization has existed in multiple incarnations since its 2006 founding. Its most recent is the Pirate National Committee (PNC), formed in 2012 as a coalition of state parties. The PNC officially recognizes Pirate parties from 10 states, and tracks and assists in the growth of more state parties throughout the United States. The board of the USPP is the board of the PNC. The chair of the Pirate National Committee is known as the "Captain". The current Captain is "Jolly" Mitch Davilo.

== History ==
The Pirate Party was founded in June 2006 by University of Georgia graduate student Brent Allison in response to the success of the Swedish Pirate Party. Its platform was focused primarily on copyright reform and freedom from Internet censorship. The party first attempted to register in Utah during the 2007/2008 election cycle and failed to collect the required number of Statements of Support. In 2011, the Massachusetts Pirate Party became the first legally recognized Pirate Party in the US. By 2011, the Pirate Party reported over 3,000 members nationwide.

In 2012, a coalition of state Pirate parties formed the Pirate National Committee (PNC). By July of that year, the PNC drafted and adopted a new constitution, which outlined a broader ideology inspired by Rick Falkvinge's Pirate Wheel.

On 1 February 2026, the party voted unanimously to officially leave Pirate Parties International (PPI), citing its stance on the Gaza genocide and the Israeli occupation of the West Bank, which it views as inconsistent with Pirates' universal promotion of the right to self-determination, as well as perceived incompatibilities in the affiliations and prior work of a senior PPI officer with Pirate principles. In their statements concerning their resignation and distancing from the PPI, they are also specifically and particularly critical of the Pirate Party Germany on this matter.

== Elections ==
In 2015, Massachusetts Pirate Party Quartermaster Steve Revilak became the first pirate in the United States to be elected to office, elected to Arlington town meeting.

On July 2, 2022, the United States Pirate Party became a member of the Pirate Parties International, an umbrella organization, comprising 31 parties all over the world at the time of the USPP's admission. They left officially on February 1, 2026.

Ethan Osborne, captain of the Kentucky Pirate Party, ran for Congress in Kentucky's 4th congressional district during the 2022 United States House of Representatives elections, finishing in 3rd place with over 10,000 votes or 3.9%. This is the largest number of votes for a Pirate candidate in US history as of 2022.

Party members voted to endorse the 2024 Vermin Supreme presidential campaign during their national convention in Bensenville, Illinois, which took place from June 1 to June 2.

== Name ==
The Pirate Party defends their oft-criticized name in the preamble of the PNC's constitution:

For our values, we have been derided as "pirates". For our hope that every person may be free to access all of human knowledge, we have been called "pirates". For our belief that one need not ask permission to participate in governance, industry, culture, and other aspects of society, we have been called "pirates". For our insistence that citizens should not be surveilled and distrusted as if they are criminals, we have been called "pirates". For our rejection of authority and profit-seeking when it does not serve the common good of all people, we have been called "pirates". We reclaim this label of "pirate" and abjure its derogatory, incendiary implication. We are Pirates. We stand for the liberty, equality, and solidarity of all human beings, and against all threats they may face.

== Ideology ==
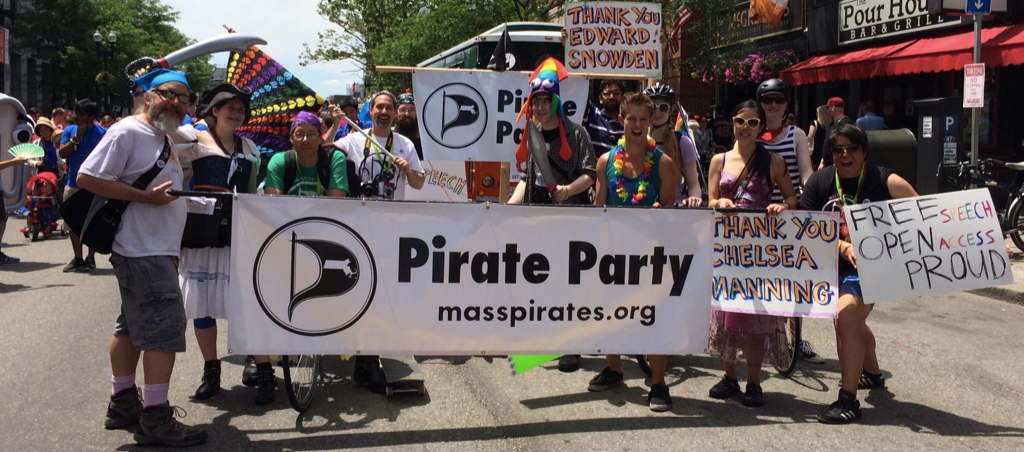
Members of the Massachusetts branch of the United States Pirate Party at a pride parade showing support for Edward Snowden and Chelsea Manning

Factions within the Pirate Party include left-libertarians, classical liberals, anarchists, progressives, and radical centrists. Many Pirates explicitly decline to identify with any particular political ideology or philosophy. These more ideologically unaffiliated members of the party have expressed their concerns to instead "do what works" rather than be driven by a particular ideology.

The Pirate Party's platform originally centered on issues of copyright. "Like its international counterparts, the USPP's main practical concerns are digital intellectual property and privacy laws—specifically, the abolition of a 1998 digital U.S. copyright law, the reduction of copyrights to 14 years (from 95 years after publication, or 70 years after the author's death), and the expiration of patents that don't result in significant progress within four years (as opposed to 20 years)."

In 2012, the party began an expansion of its platform, inspired by the Pirate Wheel. The party emphasizes the cultural values of the hacker ethic, open source and free culture, strong protection of individual civil liberties, government transparency, participatory governance, and evidence-based policy. It solidified these tenets by publishing a series of essays in January 2012 where it voiced its values using quotations from historical figures, including Benjamin Franklin ("They who can give up essential liberty to obtain a little temporary safety, deserve neither liberty nor safety"), Mark Twain ("Only one thing is impossible for God: to find any sense in any copyright law on the planet"), Albert Camus ("The only way to deal with an un-free world is to become so absolutely free that your very existence is an act of rebellion") and Thomas Jefferson ("Timid men prefer the calm of despotism to the tempestuous sea of liberty") in order to highlight the timelessness, urgency, and consensual agreement on its positions related to free culture.

== PNC ==
=== Captain ===
Before 2012, the chairman of the party was elected every July by a membership vote, as established in the party constitution. After the 2012 formation of the PNC, the role's name was changed to captain. As of July 5th, 2025, there is also a Captain for the youth wing, Young Pirates USA (YPUSA).

Name	From	To
Brent Allison	June 6, 2006	June 9, 2006
Joshua Cowles and David Sigal	June 9, 2006	May 2007
Andrew Norton	May 2007	September 2008^{a}
Glenn Kerbein	September 2008^{a}	July 2009
Ryan Martin	July 2009	December 29, 2009^{b}
Bradley Hall^{b}	December 29, 2009	January 28, 2010
Brittany Phelps^{c}	January 28, 2010	July 15, 2011
Bradley Hall	July 15, 2011	April, 2012
Travis McCrea	April, 2012	November 14, 2012
Lindsay-Anne Brunner	November 14, 2012	January 28, 2015
Andrew Norton^{d}	January 28, 2015	March 1, 2016
Joseph Klein	March 1, 2016	May 15, 2017
Lindsay-Anne Gorski	May 15, 2017	January 28, 2019
Meg Cochran	January 28, 2019	October 21, 2019
Joseph Onoroski	October 21, 2019	November 25, 2019
Lindsay-Anne Gorski^{e}	November 25, 2019	December 2, 2019
Joseph Klein	December 2, 2019	June 6, 2021
Rose Klein	June 6, 2021	June 5, 2022
Anthony Jay "AJ" Porter	June 5, 2022	August 6, 2023
Drew Bingaman^{f}	August 6, 2023	July 5th, 2025
"Jolly" Mitch Davilo	July 5th, 2025	Incumbent

^a Norton stepped down mid-term to head up Pirate Parties International. Kerbein, as operations officer, stepped into the position for the rest of the term.
^b Martin was removed via a vote of no confidence on December 29, 2009. Hall was selected as administrator pro tempore for a 30-day period until elections could be held.
^c See Wikinews interview with Peter Coti.
^d Norton resigned in order to have more time to devote to other interests.
^e Onoroski was removed via a vote of no confidence on November 25, 2019. Gorski was elected Captain pro tempore.
^f Porter resigned on August 6, 2023, elevating Vice Chair Drew Bingaman to acting Captain pro tempore. Elevated officially to Captain on September 3, 2023.

=== Officers ===
- Chair – Mitch Davilo
- Vice Chair – Blase Henry
- Treasurer – Eli McGee
- Secretary – Lily Boyt
- State Moderator - Vacant
- Auditor – Joel Lightfoot
- Swarmcare Manager – Wanda Ward
- Director of the Online - Mars Bale
- Director of Public Relations - Elliot Smith
- Captain of Young Pirates USA - Lily Boyt

== State parties ==
State	Founded	PNC Member	Notes
Alabama		No	
Alaska		No	
American Samoa		No	
Arizona		Yes	Became PNC members on July 27, 2025.
Arkansas		No	
California	August 1, 2020	Observer	
Chicagoland		Active^{1}	
Colorado		No	
Connecticut		No	
Delaware		Observer	
District of Columbia		No	
Florida		Yes	Officially moved to probationary status on the January 30, 2022 meeting, and moved to inactive status on the March 6, 2022 meeting. Readmitted at the June 23, 2024 meeting.
Georgia		No	Officially moved to probationary status on the January 30, 2022 meeting, and moved to inactive status on the March 6, 2022 meeting.
Guam		No	
Hawaii		No	
Idaho		No	
Illinois	2012	Yes	The Illinois Pirate Party was founded in 2012, but by year's end was largely inactive and never received official recognition from the USPP and Pirate National Committee outside of observer status. The party reorganized in 2020 and became PNC members October 10, 2021.
Indiana	2021	Yes	Became PNC members on October 17, 2021.
Iowa		No	
Kansas		Observer	
Kentucky	2022	No	Became PNC members on March 3, 2022. Officially moved to probationary status on the February 5, 2023 meeting following Kentucky's announcement of their departure from the United States Pirate Party on February 2, 2023.
Louisiana		No	
Maine		No	
Maryland	2026	Yes	Became PNC members on May 3, 2026.
Massachusetts	2010	Yes	Ran first pirate candidate in the United States history, JP Hollembaek, in 2012. As of June 2021, the only state party to elect a pirate to office with the election of Steve Revilak.
Michigan		No	
Minnesota		No	
Mississippi		No	
Missouri		No	
Montana		No	
Nebraska		No	
Nevada		Observer	
New Hampshire		No	
New Jersey		No	
New Mexico		No	
New York	August 25, 2010	Observer	Officially moved to probationary status on the January 30, 2022 meeting, and moved to inactive status on the March 6, 2022 meeting.
North Carolina		Observer	
North Dakota		No	
Northern Mariana Islands		No	
Ohio		Yes	Admitted at the January 4th, 2026 meeting.
Oklahoma	January 18, 2010	No	The Pirate Party of Oklahoma was formed on January 18, 2010, with the signing of its constitution, and the filing of a motion of intent to form a political party with the Oklahoma Election Board. The founding chairman was Marcus Kessler. The party was named an official state chapter of the United States Pirate Party on January 19, 2010. The party mounted a signature drive to try to gain access to the Oklahoma ballot, but was unsuccessful. The party did not run any candidates for office in 2010. Officially moved to probationary status on the January 30, 2022 meeting, and moved to inactive status on the March 6, 2022 meeting.
Oregon	November 9, 2010	No	The Oregon Pirate Party was given official state party status on November 9, 2010. Officially moved to probationary status on the January 30, 2022 meeting, and moved to inactive status on the March 6, 2022 meeting.
Pennsylvania	2022	Yes	Became PNC members on June 5, 2022.
Puerto Rico		No	
Rhode Island		No	
South Carolina		No	
South Dakota		No	
Tennessee		No	
Texas		Observer	Became PNC members on November 26, 2023. Moved to probationary status on the June 28, 2026 meeting, and moved to observer status on the August 2, 2026 meeting.
US Virgin Islands		No	
Utah		No	
Vermont		No	
Virginia		No	
Washington		No	Officially moved to probationary status on the January 30, 2022 meeting, and moved to inactive status on the March 6, 2022 meeting.
West Virginia		Observer	
Wisconsin	July 4, 2012	No	Formerly registered with the Wisconsin Government Accountability Board. Officially moved to probationary status on the March 13, 2022 meeting, moved to inactive status on the February 5, 2023 meeting.
Wyoming		No	

1 These states have active Pirate Parties, but are not PNC voting members.

== See also ==
- Copyright in the United States
- List of United States political parties
- Patent pirate
