= Viva (Dutch magazine) =

Dutch weekly magazine for women

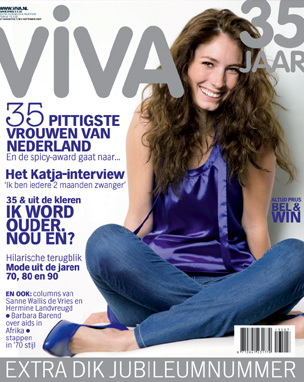
- Cover Viva 2007
- Editor-in-chief: Debby Gerritsen
- Categories: fashion magazine
- Frequency: Weekly
- Circulation: 70.000 (2012)
- Publisher: VNU (1972-2001); Sanoma (2001-present)
- Founded: 1972
- First issue: 7 October 1972; 53 years ago
- Country: Netherlands
- Based in: Amsterdam
- Language: Dutch
- ISSN: 0165-4462
- OCLC: 72711475

Viva (1975–2021) was a weekly fashion magazine for women, published in the Netherlands.

== History ==
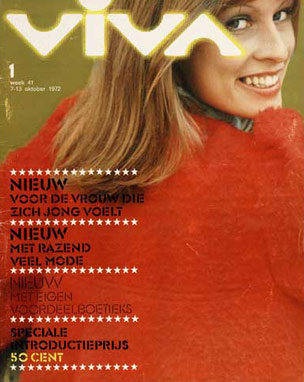
Cover of first edition, published on 7 October 1972

Viva was first published on 7 October 1972 by VNU's De Geïllustreerde Pers. It used the subtitle Damesweekblad (English: Women's weekly magazine). After 2001, it was published by Sanoma, and has a circulation of 70,000 copies (2012).

In 2012, Viva celebrated its 40th anniversary. The magazine used Layar to create an interactive magazine cover. Viva's last issue was published on 21 July 2021.

== Editor-in-chief ==
- 1972-1975: Joop Swart
- 1975-1983: Jet den Blanken
- 1983-1984: Hanny van den Horst (acting)
- 1984-1989: Adri de Vries
- 1989-1991: Koos de Boer
- 1991-1992: Koos de Boer & Rob van Vuure
- 1992-1993: Koos de Boer & Tineke Verhoeven
- 1993-2001: Tineke Verhoeven
- 2001-2005: Marije de Jong
- 2005-2008: Karin van Gilst
- 2008-2012: Corinne van Duin
- 2012-2014: Gijsje van Bentum
- 2014-2015: Vivianne Bendermacher
- 2015: Ellen de Jong (a.i.)
- 2016: Kirsten Steenvoort, Sabine Brusse
- 2017-2021?: Debby Gerritsen
