= Aleksandr Shubin (historian) =

Russian historian and politician

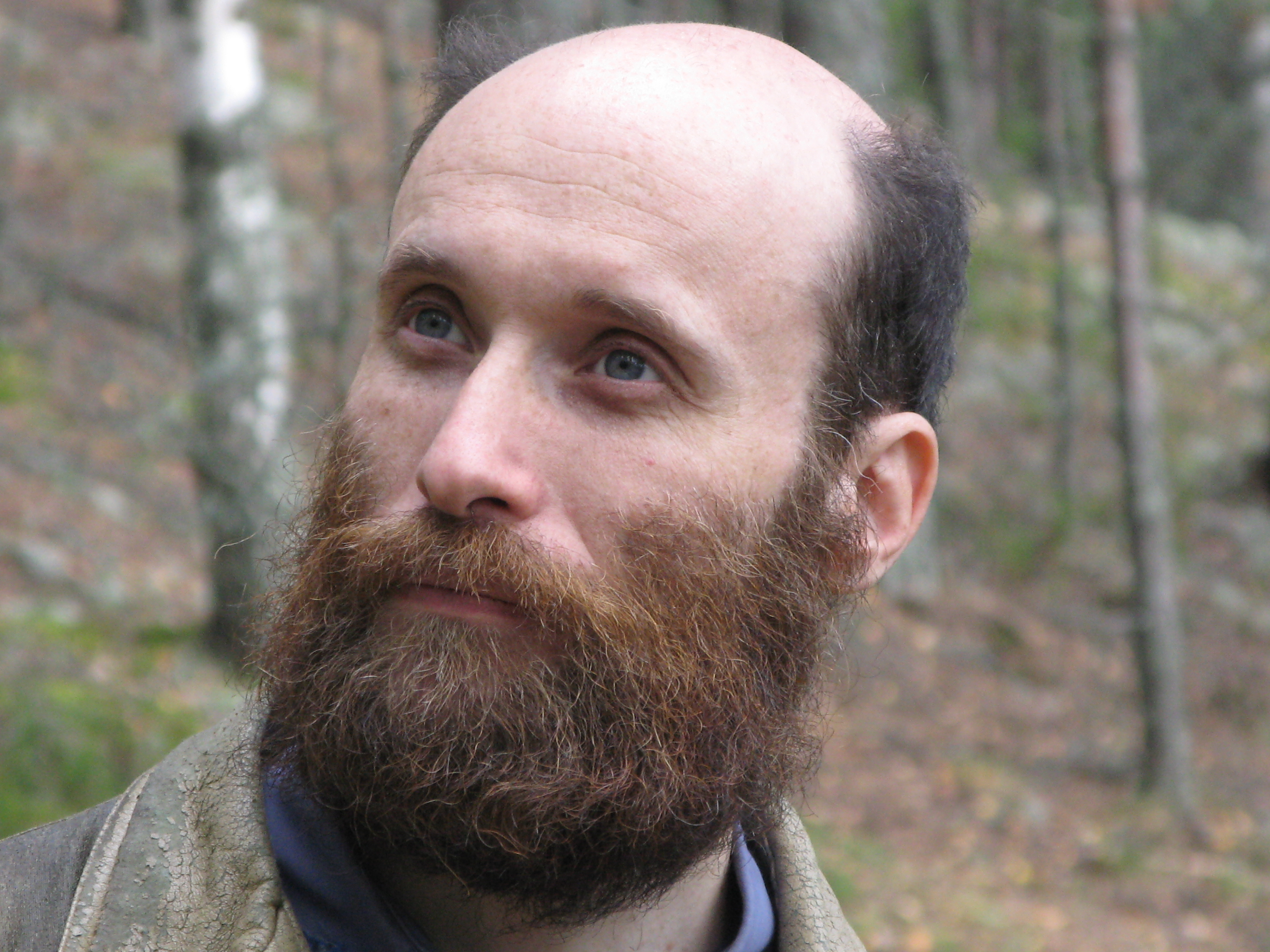
- Born: July 18, 1965; Moscow
- Education: Moscow Pedagogical State University
- Occupations: Historian, public figure, politician, opinion writer
- Employers: Institute of World History; Russian State University for the Humanities; State Academic University for the Humanities
- Political party: Pirate Party of Russia

Alexander Vladlenovich Shubin (Russian: Александр Владленович Шубин; born July 18, 1965, in Moscow) is a Russian historian and politician. Doctor of Sciences in Historical Sciences (2000), Professor at the State Academic University for the Humanities (since 2003) and the Russian State University for the Humanities (since 2007). He's also Principal Researcher at the Federal State Institution of Science Institute of World History of the Russian Academy of Sciences.

He graduated from the Moscow State Pedagogical University in 1989. He served in the Soviet Air Forces.

From 1989 he worked at the Federal State Institution of Science Institute of World History of the Russian Academy of Sciences.

He is the author more than 25 books.
