= Pirate Party of Russia =

Pirate Party of Russia Пиратская партия России
- Abbreviation: PPR (English); ППР (Russian)
- Chairperson: Anton Yershov
- Founded: 26 June 2009; 15 years ago
- Headquarters: Moscow, Russia
- Membership (2013): 15,000
- Ideology: Pirate politics Direct democracy Open government Anti-Putinism; Basic income
- Political position: Syncretic
- International affiliation: Pirate Parties International
- Colours: Black; Orange; Purple
- Slogan: "Be happy! Copy everything! Challenge the rules!" (Russian: "Будьте счастливы! Копируйте всё! Качай права!")
- State Duma: 0 / 450
- Regional Parliaments: 0 / 3,994

Website
- pirate-party.ru

The Pirate Party of Russia (PPR; Russian: Пиратская партия России; ППР; Piratskaya partiya Rossii, PPR) is a political party in Russia based on the model of the Swedish Pirate Party. It was founded in July 2009.

== History ==
In 2007, a Pirate Party movement in Russia called the Pirate Union-League of Сreative Freedom (SP - LTS) became inactive. Two years later, in the summer of 2009, it was succeeded by the modern Pirate Party of Russia, founded in light of the success of other international pirate parties. In January 2010, the first elections of the party's leadership took place.

In March 2011 the Russian Justice Ministry refused to register the party because of its name, since the "current legislation defines piracy as an attack on a sea or river craft, which is a criminal offense". The party appealed and the court hearing was scheduled to occur on 24 May. In July 2011, it was decided to officially register the party under the name "No-Name Party". On 30 June and 1 July 2012 the party was properly registered at last and with the name Pirate Party of Russia, but despite the board elected and statutes voted they still need to work in order to be fully recognized as a party.

== Notable members ==
- Lola Voronina, co-chairperson of Pirate Parties International (PPI)
- Alexander Vladlenovich Shubin
