= Hero Brinkman =

Dutch politician and police officer

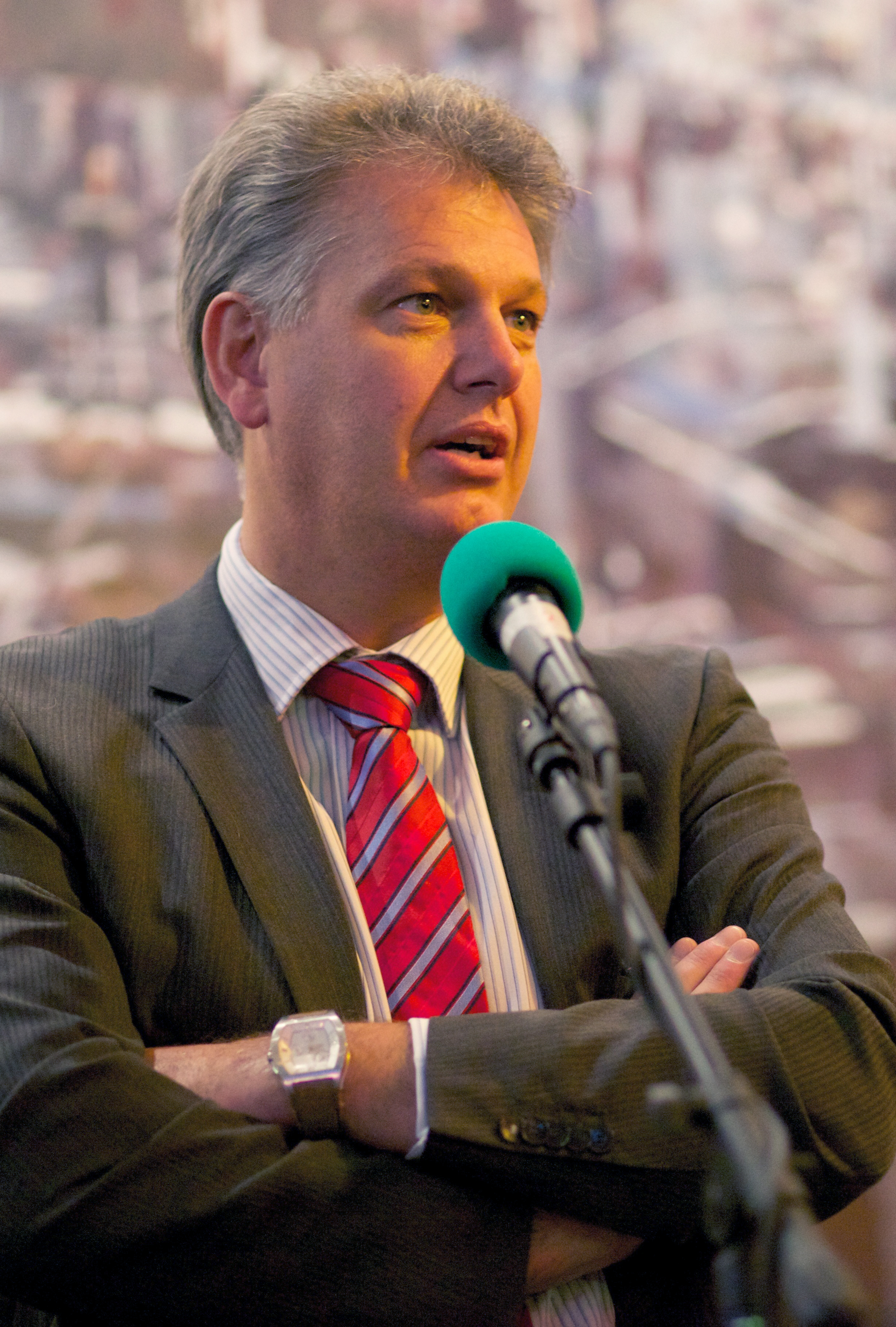

Member of the House of Representatives of the Netherlands
- In office 30 November 2006 – 19 September 2012

Personal details
- Born: 29 December 1964 (age 61) Almelo, Netherlands
- Party: Party for Freedom (2006–2012); Independent Citizens' Party (2012); Democratic Political Turning Point (2012); Entrepreneurs' Party (2015–2017); None (2012–2015, 2017– present)
- Occupation: Politician, police officer

Hero Brinkman (born 29 December 1964, in Almelo) is a Dutch police officer and former politician. He was a member of parliament from 30 November 2006 to 19 September 2012, after being elected as the number four on the electoral list for the Party for Freedom (Partij voor de Vrijheid - PVV). As the number eleven on the list, he was re-elected in June 2010. As an MP for the PVV, Brinkman focused on home affairs, government renewal, police, defence, administrative burden control, immigration, and asylum.

Brinkman repeatedly criticised the lack of democracy within the PVV. For this reason, as well as the PVV's negative generalisations about certain groups in society, Brinkman quit the PVV on 20 March 2012. As a consequence, the PVV's support for the minority first Rutte cabinet was therefore no longer sufficient to provide it with a parliamentary majority, although Brinkman indicated that he intended to continue to support the minority government.

Brinkman was also a member of the States-Provincial of North Holland for the PVV since 10 March 2011. On 22 March 2012, he announced that he would also leave the PVV in North Holland.

From 1985 to 2006, Brinkman worked in the Dutch police force of Amsterdam. As a police officer in the capital city, he was among others involved in riot control.

Brinkman and Harry van Bommel of the Socialist Party alternately write a weekly column for the free newspaper Sp!ts under the title 'Haagse Herrie' ('fuss in The Hague') in which they engage in a critical debate.
