= OpenMusic (disambiguation) =

OpenMusic is an object-oriented visual programming environment.

OpenMusic or Open music may also refer to:

- Open (music), a wider spacing of notes in a chord (as compared to close position)
- Open Music, a former state-owned record label and music publishing house in Bratislava, Czechoslovakia
- Open music, music that is available in "source code" form and allows derivative works

== See also ==
- Free music, music that can freely be copied, distributed and modified for any purpose
- Open Music Model, an economic framework proposing aper month all-you-can-download subscription fee
- Open Music System, a virtual studio management application for the Classic Mac OS
