= Open source =

Publishing digital resources with their source files

Open source is the practice of publishing digital resources publicly alongside their source code or source files, enabling use, study, modification, and redistribution. It is historically and commonly associated with open-source software. The concept has also been applied beyond software to other digital resources made available alongside their source files or design documents, such as open-source hardware, open-source educational resources or open-source fonts. The rights to reuse this type of digital resources are guaranteed through a specific legal framework, whether with open licenses or public domain dedication. The development of open source resources can be based on open collaboration, a decentralized and peer-to-peer model of production.

Open source resources are a shared component across openness movements – such as open-source software, open hardware, open education or open music – with each domain having distinct types of source files and distribution formats to manage. While the sharing of source code is an established practice with software, open resources in other fields may not systematically provide their source files, restricting the ability to modify these digital resources despite the rights granted to users.

The term open source can also refer to publicly available sources of information, notably in intelligence field with open-source intelligence (OSINT). By analogy to such practices of public access and collaboration, the notion is also used more loosely across many domains.

== Source files ==
Source files are the files containing the original, editable version of a digital resource from which a final format can be created – suitable for distribution and end use. Each type of digital resource has specific source file formats, compiled, rendered or compressed into a distribution format. Open licenses grant the right to modify a digital resource, but access to its source files is a necessary condition to effectively provide the ability to do so and enable future improvements.

Source files and distribution formats examples
Domain	Source file	Distribution format
Documents	.md, .tex, .odt	.pdf
Images	.svg, .psd	.png, .jpg
Fonts	.glyphs, .ufo	.ttf, .otf, .woff
Hardware	.fcstd, .kicad	.stl, .gerber
Software	.c, .go, .py	executable
Music	.mid, .aup	.mp3

In practice, open resources can regularly be provided only in their distribution format – a 2016 study of Thingiverse found that 84% of shared designs were in STL format, with source file formats being dramatically less common.

== Copyright and licensing ==
By default with the current copyright system around the world, new works are automatically protected on creation with all rights reserved to its author. Legal instruments have been developed across open practices to grant reuse, modification and distribution rights, including open licenses and public domain dedications, with distinct types emerging for each domain. While works in the public domain could represent the maximum degree of openness, open licenses can come with few or no restrictions forming a spectrum of openness from fully copyrighted to fully open works. Open licenses maintain the author's ownership while granting reuse rights through copyright law.

Creative Commons license spectrum

Different open licenses have been developed to address the specific legal and practical needs of different types of digital resources, as a license suitable for one domain may not be suitable for another. Creative Commons licenses are widely used for cultural work, including research articles, educational resources, and artistic works. In software, a common set of open licenses are those approved by the Open Source Initiative based on their Open Source Definition – it requires licenses to allow anyone to use the software for any purpose. For fonts, there is the SIL Open Font License which prohibits the standalone sale of font files; for hardware, there is the CERN Open Hardware Licence which extends coverage to patent rights alongside copyright; for data, there is the Open Database License which addresses specific database rights beyond copyright. These are illustrative examples of key licenses for each field; each domain encompasses a variety of open licenses offering different sets of rights and permissions.

By being free of copyright restriction, dedication of works to the public domain may enable everyone to freely use and modify a resource, with rights that can be expired or waived. However, copyright is a complex system with varying laws across jurisdictions, a public domain dedication may even be impossible in some places – therefore a work can be in the public domain in one country but not in another. The moral rights may be inalienable, such as in France, with the author or their heirs who may object to modifications impacting the integrity of a public domain work. The licence Creative Commons CC0 Public Domain Dedication provides a means to consistently guarantee the same rights worldwide, with a license fallback.

The system of open licenses like Creative Commons can be seen as problematic as private solutions relying on contract law, with a variety of actors calling for a copyright reform because commercial interests are seen to be protected at the expense of the public good. Creative Commons itself acknowledges that its licenses "are a patch, not a fix, for the problems of the copyright system".

== Open collaboration ==
Open collaboration refers to any "system of innovation or production that relies on goal-oriented yet loosely coordinated participants who cooperate voluntarily to create a product (or service) of economic value, which is made freely available to contributors and noncontributors alike." The organizing principle behind open collaboration is that of peer production. Peer production communities are structured in an entirely decentralized manner, but differ from markets in that they function without price-based coordination, and often on the basis of volunteering only.

Such communities are geared toward the production of openly accessible public or "common" goods, but differ from the State as well as charity groups in that they operate without a formal hierarchical structure, and rest solely on the construction of a rough, evolving consensus among participants. It is prominently observed in open source software, and has been initially described in Richard Stallman's GNU Manifesto, as well as Eric S. Raymond's 1997 essay, The Cathedral and the Bazaar. Beyond open source software, open collaboration is also applied to the development of other types of mind or creative works, such as information provision in Internet forums, or the production of encyclopedic content within Wikipedia.

This model has become increasingly important in online knowledge communities.

== Type of open source resources ==
=== Software ===
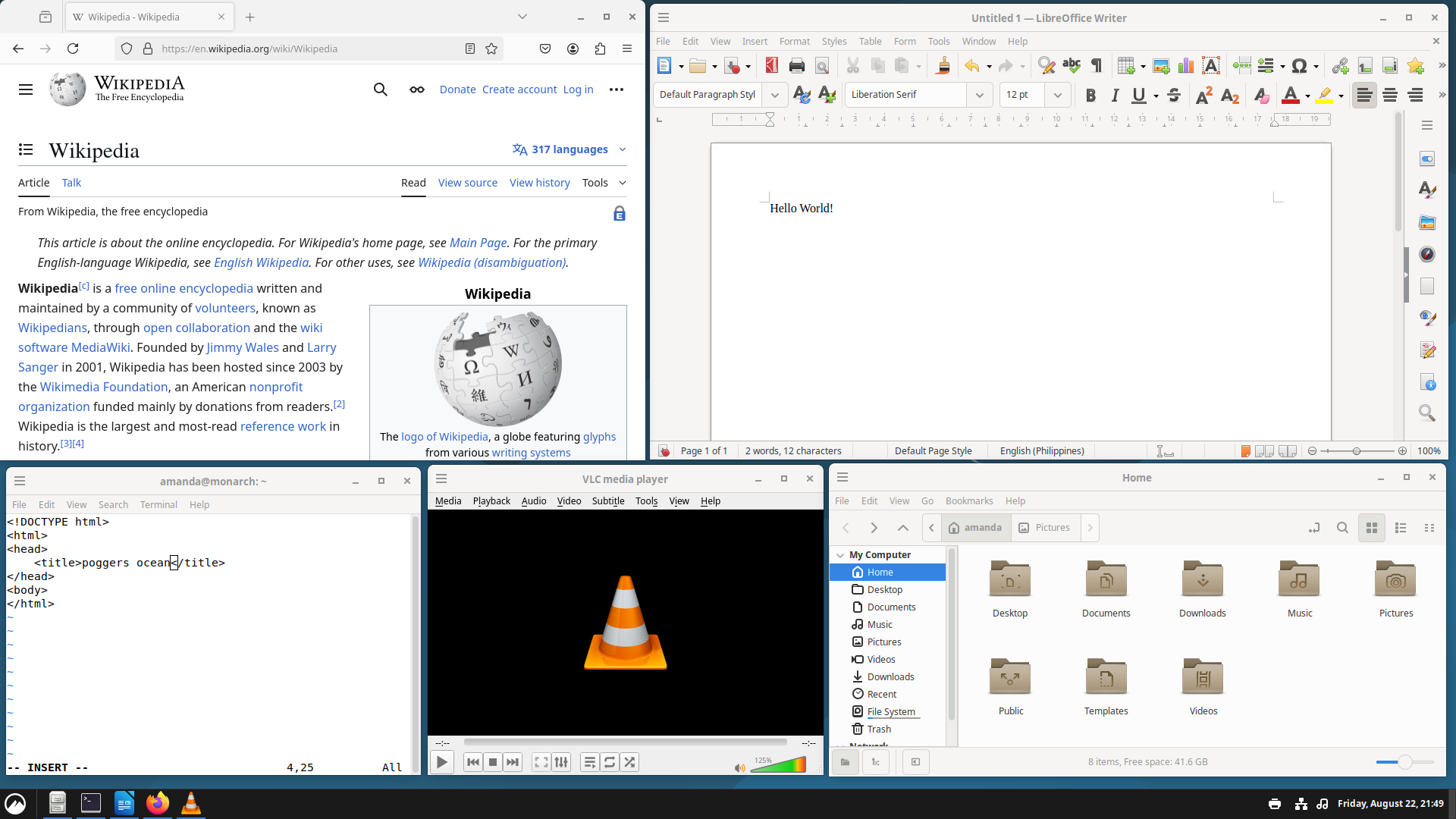
A screenshot of Debian Linux running the Cinnamon desktop environment, featuring Firefox (accessing Wikipedia which uses MediaWiki), LibreOffice Writer, Vim, VLC and Nemo file manager, all of which are open-source software

Open-source software (OSS) is computer software released under a license allowing users to use, study, modify, and distribute it to anyone for any purpose – in contrast to proprietary (closed-source) software. These abilities are typically granted through open licenses or, more rarely, by dedication to the public domain. The development of open-source software can be based on open collaboration, a decentralized model of production. Open-source software is commonly defined according to The Open Source Definition of the Open Source Initiative, but the precise meaning of "open source" remains contentious.

Open-source software offers a range of benefits, but also presents specific risks and challenges. It can provide improved accessibility through lower and shared costs, greater adaptability through customization, transparency with auditable code, better interoperability via open standards, and independence from vendor lock-in, among others. The ubiquity of open-source software raises cybersecurity concerns and maintenance challenges.

Open-source software has become the backbone of the global digital infrastructure, powering domains such as web servers, cloud computing, supercomputers, mobile devices, artificial intelligence, and Internet of Things. A 2022 estimate suggests that between 80 and 96 percent of the code making up software on the market today, including proprietary software, is of open-source origin. Its adoption has grown steadily across public institutions, the private sector, and academia, driven by motivations of cybersecurity, digital sovereignty, and independence from proprietary software, with significant geopolitical implications. Organizations are increasingly setting up Open Source Program Offices to manage their strategies.

Open-source software has its roots in the culture of source code sharing that dates back to the origins of computing in the 1950s. The term was formalized in 1998 with the founding of the Open Source Initiative, succeeding the free software movement initiated in the 1980s, with the intention of overcoming the ambiguity of the word "free" — meaning both freedom and gratis — to better appeal to the business world.

Major examples include the Linux kernel, the Firefox web browser or Bitcoin. MediaWiki, the software powering Wikipedia, is itself an example of open-source software.

=== Hardware ===
The "open source hardware" logo proposed by OSHWA, one of the main defining organizations

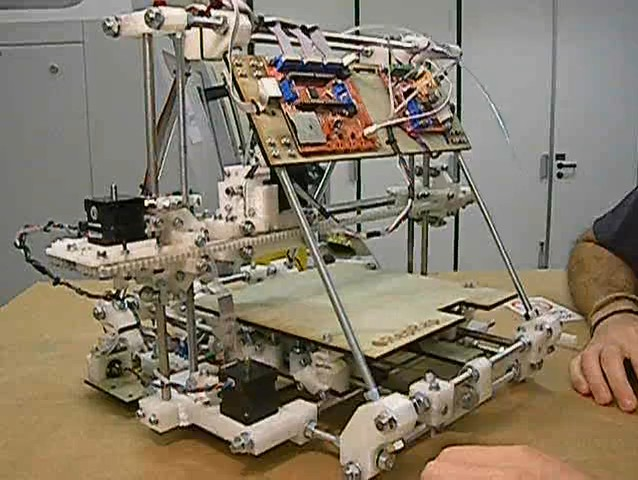
The RepRap Mendel general-purpose 3D printer with the ability to make copies of most of its own structural parts

Open-source hardware (OSH, OSHW) is hardware whose design source files — schematics, CAD files, bill of materials — are made publicly available, allowing anyone to study, modify, make and distribute the hardware. Both free and open-source software (FOSS) and open-source hardware are created by this open-source culture movement and apply a similar concept to a variety of components. It is sometimes, thus, referred to as free and open-source hardware (FOSH), meaning that the design is easily available ("open") and that it can be used, modified and shared freely ("free"). The term usually means that information about the hardware is easily discerned so that others can make it – coupling it closely to the maker movement. Hardware design (i.e. mechanical drawings, schematics, bills of material, PCB layout data, HDL source code and integrated circuit layout data), in addition to the software that drives the hardware, are all released under free/libre terms. The original sharer gains feedback and potentially improvements on the design from the FOSH community. There is now significant evidence that such sharing can drive a high return on investment for the scientific community.

It is not enough to merely use an open-source license; an open source product or project will follow open source principles, such as modular design and community collaboration.

Since the rise of reconfigurable programmable logic devices, sharing of logic designs has been a form of open-source hardware. Instead of the schematics, hardware description language (HDL) code is shared. HDL descriptions are commonly used to set up system-on-a-chip systems either in field-programmable gate arrays (FPGA) or directly in application-specific integrated circuit (ASIC) designs. HDL modules, when distributed, are called semiconductor intellectual property cores, also known as IP cores.

Open-source hardware also helps alleviate the issue of proprietary device drivers for the free and open-source software community, however, it is not a pre-requisite for it, and should not be confused with the concept of open documentation for proprietary hardware, which is already sufficient for writing FLOSS device drivers and complete operating systems. The difference between the two concepts is that OSH includes both the instructions on how to replicate the hardware itself as well as the information on communication protocols that the software (usually in the form of device drivers) must use in order to communicate with the hardware (often called register documentation, or open documentation for hardware), whereas open-source-friendly proprietary hardware would only include the latter without including the former.

=== Artificial intelligence ===
Open-source artificial intelligence, as defined by the Open Source Initiative, is an AI system that is freely available to use, study, modify, and share. This includes datasets used to train the model, its code, and its model parameters, promoting a collaborative and transparent approach to AI development so someone could create a substantially similar result.

The debate over what should count as 'open-source' given a range of openness among AI projects has been significant. Some large language models touted as open-sourced that are merely open weights and do not release training data and code have been criticized as "openwashing" systems that are mostly closed. For example, Artificial Analysis gives an "Openness Index" of 83% to Nvidia's Nemotron family, for its greater transparency in methodology, pre-training data, and post-training data, while China's frontier open weights models broadly score under 50%.

Open-source AI is a major issue in geopolitics and artificial intelligence controversies, sometimes characterized as an AI arms race or AI Cold War between the US and China. Broadly, models released by Chinese companies, such as DeepSeek, Alibaba Cloud, Moonshot AI and Z.ai, use an open weights framework, under more permissive software licenses like Apache or MIT. United States AI companies, including OpenAI, Anthropic, SpaceXAI, Google DeepMind largely favor a proprietary software framework, especially for larger models. These are in part national government policy decisions, because public access to AI technology has many consequences. Some US politicians have called to restrict US public access to Chinese AI tools.

Popular open-source artificial intelligence project categories include large language models (LLM), machine translation tools, and chatbots. Debate over the benefits and risks of open-sourced AI involve a range of factors like security, privacy and technological advancement. As of July 2026, the largest open weight frontier model is Kimi K3, developed by Moonshot AI, at 2.8 trillion parameters, followed by Alibaba Cloud's Qwen3.8 at 2.4 trillion parameters.

In addition to the 2.4 trillion parameters, there are 95 billion active parameters; it is the first Qwen-Max-class model released with public weights. The downloadable model is text-only and has a 262K native context window extensible to about one million tokens, while the Qwen3.8-Max managed version includes additional features. Accio Work and Qwen3.8-Max are separate Alibaba ecosystem products. Accio Work is an Alibaba International agentic-commerce platform that supports Qwen alongside third-party model families, while Qwen3.8-Max was made available through Alibaba Cloud Model Studio and QwenWork. Public sources reviewed do not confirm that Accio Work specifically uses Qwen3.8-Max or its downloadable Qwen3.8-2.4T-A95B checkpoint.

=== Education ===
In open education and by extension to open educational resources (OER), the notion of "open source educational resources" has been theorized to specify OER which provide their source files. In order to make meaningful edits to these educational resources it is necessary to access their source files, in accordance with the ALMS framework (Access to Editing Tools, Level of Expertise Required, Meaningfully Editable, Self-Sourced). It is common for Open Educational Resources such as open textbooks to be available only in a final format such as PDF, limiting the ability of users to modify them despite the rights provided by open licenses. UNESCO's Recommendation on OER explicitly calls for "developing mechanisms to support and incentivize all stakeholders to publish source files and accessible OER using standard open file formats in public repositories."

Open-source book also extend this principle to books, where source files such as LaTeX or Markdown files are made publicly available alongside the final PDF.

=== Fonts ===
Open source fonts are typefaces made publicly available alongside their source files. Font editors store typefaces in source formats such as .glyphs, UFO, or VFC during development, and compile them into binary formats such as OTF, TTF, or WOFF for end use. The SIL Open Font License (OFL), created by SIL International in 2005, is a license specifically designed for open source fonts. Notable examples include DejaVu fonts and Source Sans.

=== Film ===
Open-source films (also known as open-content films and free-content films) are films which are produced and distributed by using free and open-source and open content methodologies. Their source files are freely available and the licenses used meet the demands of the Open Source Initiative (OSI) in terms of freedom.

=== Music ===
Open music is music that is shareable and may provide source files — such as lyrics, MIDI files, samples, track-by-track audio files, or Audacity .AUP project files — allowing meaningful modification. It is the concept of "open source" computer software applied to music. However, the non-commercial stipulation associated with Open Music is incompatible with the first section of the Open Source Definition as well as the first freedom put forth in The Free Software Definition (freedom 0). Open Music is one of the general responses to the RIAA's and governmental actions against the music industry and its consumers.

"Open music" can be considered a subset of "free music" (referring to freedom). The differences of philosophy between advocates of "open source software" and "free software" have not surfaced in the community of musicians contributing music to the copyleft commons. This may be due to the relatively recent emergence of copyleft music, as well as to the fact that software development generally involves much more collaboration and derivatization than does music production. It is not clear that open collaboration using copyleft licenses provides any significant advantages in music production, as open source advocates commonly argue is the case for software development.

Several websites have surfaced to provide musicians with the platform and tools necessary for online music collaboration. Most of these sites promote one or more of the Creative Commons licenses, allowing derivative works and sharing of the finished songs. Early implementations of these collaboration sites relied on threaded discussion forum software and FTP to provide a means for musicians to initiate and discuss projects, and to share multi-track files. More recent and modern sites provide robust project-management features, automatic encoding and compression, online playback streaming, web-based upload and download options, chat, and project-based discussion forums.

There are plenty of artists that use Creative Commons Licenses. One of the most open licences is "Creative Commons Attribution" License.

== Other meanings ==
=== Open-source intelligence ===
Open-source intelligence (OSINT) is the collection and analysis of data gathered from 'open sources' (overt sources and publicly available information) to produce intelligence. OSINT is primarily used in national security, law enforcement, and business intelligence and is used by analysts to answer classified, unclassified, or proprietary intelligence requirements.

=== Analogous uses ===
The term "open source" is also used more loosely by analogy to refer to public access of information and/or decentralized collaborative practices.

- Open-source colas
- Open-source religion
- Open-source governance
- Open-source political campaigns
- Open-source journalism
- Open Source Seed Initiative
- Open-source unionism
- Open-source ethics, school of thought
- Open Source Drug Discovery
- Open Source Malaria Consortium
- Open-source genomics

== See also ==
=== Openness movements ===
- Open access
- Open content
- Open data
- Open design
- Open education
- Open government
- Open hardware
- Open innovation
- Open knowledge
- Open music
- Open publishing
- Open science
- Open-source software
- Open standard

=== Other ===
- Open Source Initiative
- Open Sources: Voices from the Open Source Revolution (book)
- Commons-based peer production
- Digital commons
- Digital public goods
- Digital rights
- Diseconomies of scale
- Free content
- Gift economy
- Glossary of legal terms in technology
- Mass collaboration
- Network effect
- Proprietary software
- Shared Source
- Sharing economy
- Software maintainer
- Source-available software
