= Sal Randolph =

American artist and theorist (born 1959)

- Born: Sarah Tod Fitz Randolph; May 30, 1959 (age 67); New York City, New York
- Education: Harvard University & Radcliffe College
- Known for: Social architecture, Gift Economies, and Internet Art
- Notable work: Free Manifesta Free Words Opsound
- Awards: Massachusetts Artist Fellowship

Sal Randolph (born May 30, 1959) is an American artist and theorist who works with issues of gift-giving, money, alternate economies, and social architecture. She founded the non-curated sound-exchange web project Opsound, which functions through the use of music released exclusively under a copyleft license, and has been cited by Lawrence Lessig as an example of how Creative Commons works to enable artists to collaborate more freely and build on each other's work. Other large-scale, collaborative projects created and implemented by Randolph include Free Manifesta and The Free Biennial, in which several hundred artists presented their work in free and open shows in New York's and Frankfurt am Main's public spaces. Artists participating in those projects included Christophe Bruno, Aram Saroyan, Swoon (artist), and Michael Cunningham, among many others.

Pursuing her ongoing interest in issues surrounding money and economies of attention and exclusivity, she gained entry into Manifesta 4 by purchasing her entry from the Basel-based Christoph Büchel when that artist auctioned his participation rights on eBay – which was itself an art piece/provocation. This led to Free Manifesta, in which, through Randolph, hundreds of artists were suddenly allowed to participate in the previously exclusive Manifesta. This work extended the artist's first large-scale cooperative project, The Free Biennial in her home city of New York, which came into being as her response to the Whitney Biennial, and which also garnered the participation of a wide range of noted artists across many disciplines. Among her other projects is Free Words, an early shopdropping (a form of culture jamming) project which garnered an international network of volunteers who "introduced" the book Free Words (a large collection of random words initially assembled by Randolph—and later by hundreds of project contributors—over many years) into bookstores and libraries around the world. Other projects include works in sound art, and a variety of exhibitions within the collaborative Glowlab. Recent projects include Free Money (shown in Vancouver, where she was invited to participate in the Live Biennale), Free Press (shown in Röda Sten Contemporary Art Space in Göteborg, Sweden, where the artist created an open access publishing house), ReadingBetween, and InTheConversation.

Her work as a writer and theorist explores issues related to post-autonomous art and the gift; she has both written for and created actions within Cabinet Magazine, and her writing on the experience of art has recently been featured in The American Reader.

The artist's work has been presented in numerous museum and gallery exhibitions, including Manifesta 4 and "Don’t Miss" in Frankfurt am Main, the Neue Gesellschaft für Bildende Kunst (NGBK) and BüroFriedrich Gallery in Berlin, La Box in Bourges, the Palais de Tokyo and Bétonsalon in Paris, Röda Sten in Göteborg, Live Bienalle/Western Front in Vancouver, Art Interactive and Oni Gallery in Boston, as well as Cinders Gallery, Pace Digital Gallery, the Fountain Art Fair, Salvation Gallery, and the Conflux Festival in New York. Randolph teaches and lectures as a visiting artist and has appeared in that capacity at the UCRIA conference, Open Engagement, Maryland Institute College of Art, the GEL conference, Massachusetts College of Art, Hochschule für Gestaltung Offenbach, RISD, and in collaboration with D. Graham Burnett at Princeton.

== Additional references ==
- "Manifesta opens in Frankfurt - Artworld". Art in America. 90 (5). May 2002. Archived from the original on December 30, 2004 – via FindArticles.
- Dannat, Adrian. “Adrian Dannatt’s New York Diary: FREE WORDS–any words” The Art Newspaper, No. 121 January 2002.
- Paharia, Neeru. "Featured Commoner: Interview with Sal Randolph" Creative Commons, https://creativecommons.org/weblog/entry/7012 March, 2003
- Snodgrass, Susan (January 1, 2003). "defining Europe? Acting more as facilitators than as curatorial stars, the organizers of last summer's Manifesta created an experimental visual forum—with mixed results - Report From Frankfurt". Art in America. 91 (1). Archived from the original on September 29, 2004.
- Ulaby, Neda, “Free Books in Public Places” Weekend Edition Saturday, May 18, 2002 https://www.npr.org/2002/05/18/1143585/free-books-in-public-places
- Velthius, Olav, Imaginary Economics; Contemporary Artists and the World of Big Money, NAi Publishers, Belgium, 2005
- Wong, Sherry, "Bonus Biennials" Artnet April, 2002 https://www.artnet.com/Magazine/reviews/wong/wong3-15-02.asp
- Zimmerman, Brian "Public Notice" Village Voice, May 6, 2003 http://www.villagevoice.com/news/0319,zimmerman,43875,1.html
- Myles, Eileen, "Shore Leave" Village Voice, August 15, 2000
- Perra, Daniele. "web sites: 1. www.freewords.org" Tema Celeste, Number 93, Fall 2002.
- Werneburg, Brigitte. "Logistik für Bandwürmer,” TAZ, May 28, 2002.
- Zolyóm, Francisca. "Everyone is Invited: Interview with Sal Randolph" Exindex, http://www.exindex.hu, December 2002.
- Balint, Anna. "Resist the Flattening Effect of Being on Display: Interview with Sal Randolph" ART-Hoc, No. 22-23, December, 2002.
