= Free music =

Music in the public domain or under a free license

The crossed out copyright symbol with a musical note on the right hand side is the free music symbol, signifying a lack of copyright restrictions on music. It may be used in the abstract, or applied to a sound recording or musical composition.

Free music or libre music is music that can freely be copied, distributed and modified for any purpose. Free music is either in the public domain or licensed under a free license by the artist or copyright holder themselves, often as a method of promotion. Free refers to libre, not free of charge.

Some free music is licensed under licenses that are intended for software (like the GPL) or other writings (the GFDL). There are licenses specifically for music and other works of art, such as the Free Music Public License (FMPL), the Free To Use License, EFF's Open Audio License, LinuxTag's Open Music License, the Free Art license and some of the Creative Commons licenses. The Free Music Philosophy generally encourages creators to free music using whatever language or methods they wish.

== History ==
Before the advent of copyright law in the early 18th century and its subsequent application to music compositions first, all music was "free" according to the definitions used in free software or free music, since there were no copyright restrictions. In practice however, music reproduction was generally restricted to live performances and the legalities of playing other people's music was unclear in most jurisdictions. Copyright laws changed this gradually so much so that in the late 20th century, copying a few words of a musical composition or a few seconds of a sound recording, the two forms of music copyright, could be considered criminal infringement.

In response, the concept of free music was codified in the Free Music Philosophy by Ram Samudrala in early 1994. It was based on the idea of Free Software by Richard Stallman and coincided with nascent open art and open information movements. Up to this point, few modern musicians distributed their recordings and compositions in an unrestricted manner, and there was no concrete rationale as to why they did it, or should do it.

The Free Music Philosophy used a three pronged approach to voluntarily encourage the spread of unrestricted copying, based on the fact that copies of recordings and compositions could be made and distributed with complete accuracy and ease via the Internet. First, since music by its very nature is organic in its growth, the ethical basis of limiting its distribution using copyright laws was questioned. That is, an existential responsibility was fomented upon music creators who were drawing upon the creations of countless others in an unrestricted manner to create their own. Second, it was observed that the basis of copyright law, "to promote the progress of science and useful arts", had been perverted by the music industry to maximise profit over creativity resulting in a huge burden on society (the control of copying) simply to ensure its profits. Third, as copying became rampant, it was argued that musicians would have no choice but to move to a different economic model that exploited the spread of information to make a living, instead of trying to control it with limited government enforced monopolies.

The Free Music Philosophy was reported on by diverse media outlets including Billboard, Forbes, Levi's Original Music Magazine, The Free Radical, Wired and The New York Times. Along with free software and Linux (a free operating system), copyleft licenses, the explosion of the Web and rise of P2P, the cementing of mp3 as a compression standard for recordings, and despite the efforts of the music industry, free music became largely the reality in the early 21st century. Organisations such as the Electronic Frontier Foundation and Creative Commons with free information champions like Lawrence Lessig were devising numerous licenses that offered different flavours of copyright and copyleft. The question was no longer why and how music should be free, but rather how creativity would flourish while musicians developed models to generate revenue in the Internet era.

== Record labels and websites distributing free music ==
- Audition Records – free and non-free CC licenses
- Dogmazic – free and non-free CC licenses, GNU GPL
- Free Music Archive – free and non-free CC licenses
- Jamendo – free and non-free CC licenses, Free Art License
- Incompetech - CC BY, paid licenses available
- Loca Records
- Magnatune
- Opsound
- Musopen
- NoCopyrightSounds
- Free Stock Music

== Notable bands distributing their music under free or close-to-free conditions ==
Note that some licenses, such as CC BY-NC, are not free by definition. However, works under these licenses are listed here as being related to the topic.

| Title | | Licenses |
|---|---|---|
| Nine Inch Nails | The Slip | CC BY-NC-SA |
| Nine Inch Nails | Ghosts I–IV | CC BY-NC-SA |
| Severed Fifth | | Creative Commons |
| Twisted Helices | | |
| subatomicglue | | |
| Brunette Models | | |
| Kimiko Ishizaka | | Creative Commons Zero license – Public Domain |

== See also ==
- Copyleft
- Deezer
- Free Culture movement
- File sharing
- Independent record label
- Guvera
- Libre.fm
- ListenBrainz
- Lists of record labels
- List of largest music deals
- List of musical works released in a stem format
- Mutopia Project
- Music industry
- Music recording sales certification
- Open music
- Open Music Model
- Podsafe
- We7
- Wolfgang's Vault
