= David M. Berry =

British philosopher and musician

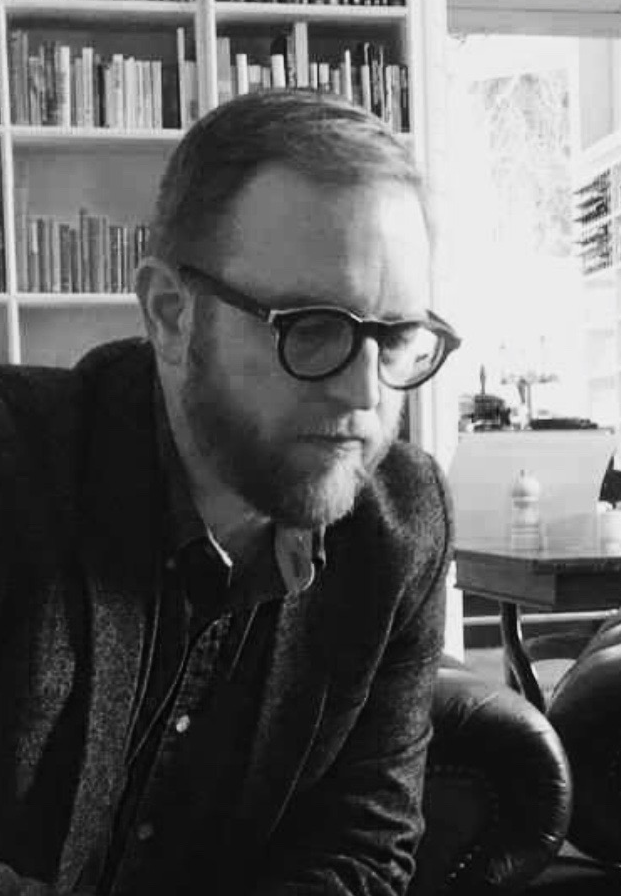
- Berry in Brighton, 2013
- Born: 1974 (age 51–52)

Philosophical work
- Era: Contemporary philosophy
- Region: Western philosophy
- School: Continental philosophy Critical theory
- Institutions: University of Sussex; King's College, London; University of Oxford; University of Cambridge; Goethe University Frankfurt am Main; Swansea University
- Main interests: Critical Theory; Digital Humanities; Software Studies; Philosophy of Technology; History of the University
- Notable ideas: The Computational Turn in Digital Humanities; Critical Digital Humanities; Postdigital

David M. Berry is a Professor of Digital Humanities at the University of Sussex, writer and musician. He is widely published on academic work related to the fields of critical theory, digital humanities, media theory and algorithms.

== Biography ==
Berry was born in Birmingham and moved South to study technology, philosophy and sociology. After studying he worked at Reuters in London, until he decided to go back to pursue a masters and then PhD doctorate. Berry's early academic work focused on the philosophy of technology and particularly understanding open source and free software. His work has explored the area of critical digital humanities, the notion of explainability, and the historical idea of a university. More recently he has started researching what he calls the vector medium, arguing the vector space is a new form of media that needs new tool to understand it. This he identifies as a paradigm shift from the digital to vectors. In consequence he has articulated "vector theory" which he argues, "is an attempt to take seriously the epistemological effects of the reality that the dominant computational paradigm is no longer symbolic but statistical, no longer Boolean but probabilistic. Negroponte argued back in 1996 that we were moving from atoms to bits, and whilst the vector does not displace the bit in the way the bit was said to displace the atom, the relevant unit of computational meaning has shifted from the discrete symbol to the high-dimensional vector". With a new vector medium we will expect to see new forms of vector culture and new companies formed to exploit the vector form of representation and generation.

In 1994, Berry co-founded, with Gibby Zobel, the radical newspaper SchNEWS whilst living in Brighton and he was involved in the protests against the Criminal Justice and Public Order Act 1994. Berry later went to work for Reuters Ltd working in London, and whilst in London also founded a record label, Loca Records in Old Street with Marcus McCallion in 1999. Loca Records was notable for releasing music in open access formats, such as the Gnu GPL and Creative Commons licenses. Whilst running the record label he released electronica music under the names Meme (Loca Records) and Ward (Static Caravan Recordings).

In 2000, Berry returned to Brighton to study a Masters in Social and Political Thought and in 2002 a PhD at the University of Sussex (funded by the ESRC). In 2007 he began work at Swansea University as a lecturer, moving in 2013 as a Reader (and then Professor) at the University of Sussex. In 2015 he co-founded the Sussex Humanities Lab at the University of Sussex, exploring the relation between digital cultures, literatures, materialities and philosophy.

Berry's first book published in 2008, Copy, Rip, Burn: The Politics of Copyleft and Open Source, undertook an examination of the way in which the proponents of the free software and open source communities understood their respective projects and how they articulated them in terms of an often implicit political ideology. The aim was to situate their ideas and practices within a broader movement of economic change brought on by the digitalisation of the economy and the shift to a so-called information society. Part of this change involves a movement in the way in which society conceptualises many of the background assumptions in terms of new notions, such as computational metaphors, stories and claims of an "open" or "free" norm that governs particular spheres of activity, such as "open science".

The book, The Philosophy of Software: Code and Mediation in a Digital Age, is Berry's second book, and is widely seen as both an important contribution to thinking about software, code and algorithms from a philosophical standpoint but also the outlines of a useful research programme. From questions about the "whatness" of software and code, to issues raised by reading and writing code, to a general programme of a phenomenology of software, the book concludes with a discussion of the becoming-stream of contemporary life due to software and the "real-time" of streams.

In Critical Theory and the Digital, published in 2014, the author looks to the Frankfurt School to develop a critical framework for thinking about software and algorithms. In this book he raises the particular issue of a form of software or computational metaphysics becoming prevalent as a new ideology which serves to mystify and obscure computation and its origins. Whilst an important contribution, this book tends to concentrate on the first generation critical theorists and the promised second book that takes account the second and third generation critical theorists is not yet published. Nonetheless, Berry proposes a new critical reading of the digital informed by an understanding of alienation and exploitation that is generated by computational technologies by drawing from this first generation critical theory scholarship and sets important foundations for future work.

In Digital Humanities: Knowledge and Critique in a Digital Age, together with the Norwegian academic Anders Fagerjord, they examine the history and theory in the area known as Digital Humanities.

In 2019 he released new music under the name ØxØ on Truant Recordings with fellow musician Barnaby Thorn in the genre of Conceptronica.

Berry is a member of the Internation Collectiv led by the late Bernard Stiegler which addressed the challenges of 21st century climate change and sustainability in relation to imagining a new political economy in a post-computational world. The collective published its first book called Bifurquer: Il n'y a pas d'alternative in 2020. The English translation of this book called Bifurcation: There is no Alternative, was published by Open Humanities Press in 2021. His recent discussions of explainability have built on this previous work, particularly in relation to artificial intelligence, machine-learning and meaning together with theories of explanation.

Berry is part of a research group, including Jeff Shrager who wrote the first BASIC version of ELIZA, that has uncovered the original source code for the chatbot ELIZA that was developed by Joseph Weizenbaum in the 1960s. The original source code was thought to have been long lost but was discovered in the MIT archives and has been made available for public release by Weizenbaum's family. The ELIZA source code has historical interest for historians and computer scientists and has been very influential on subsequent chatbot development. In addition the source code for Weizenbaum's SLIP software, which he wrote to add list-processing to the MAD system, has also been discovered and made available.

Central to Berry's analysis is the concept of the "Inversion," a theoretical framework that describes a critical threshold where AI-generated synthetic media becomes so prevalent and sophisticated that it overwhelms the verification capacities of existing media institutions. Berry argues that this creates not merely a technical challenge but a profound epistemological crisis that affects society's ability to distinguish between authentic and artificial content.

His research suggests that this verification crisis could lead to widespread confusion about the nature of reality itself, as traditional mechanisms for establishing truth and authenticity become increasingly unreliable. Berry examines how this transformation might reshape social consciousness, cultural production, and democratic discourse, arguing that the Inversion represents a qualitative shift in how societies produce and authenticate shared reality under conditions of pervasive synthetic media. He has also outlined ways that these issues can be managed through new forms of AI methods that enable close iterative loops to control the processes of generative AI in positive ways. More recently he is writing critiques of artificial intelligence from the perspective of the mechanisms of AI, and LLMs in particular, which he has been developing in his blog, Stunlaw. An example of this is an article on bliss attractors and their implications for synthetic companions and interaction with chatbots.

He has held visiting fellowships at King's College London, Forschungskolleg Humanwissenschaften (Institute for Advanced Studies) at Goethe University Frankfurt am Main, The School of Advanced Study, London, Lincoln College and Mansfield College at the University of Oxford, Wolfson College and CRASSH at the University of Cambridge, the Parliamentary Office of Science and Technology at the Houses of Parliament, and the University of Oslo.

== Notable works ==
As author

- Ciston, S., Berry, D. M., Hay, A., Marino, M. C., Millican, P., Shrager, J., Schwarz, A., & Weil, P. (2026). Inventing ELIZA: How the First Chatbot Shaped the Future of AI. MIT Press.
- Berry, D. M. and Fagerjord (2017) Digital Humanities: Knowledge and Critique in a Digital Age, London: Polity. ISBN 978-0745697666, pp. 248. [Translated into Japanese and Chinese]
- Berry, D. M. (2014) Critical Theory and the Digital. New York: Bloomsbury Academic. ISBN 978-1441166395. Pp. 279.
- Berry, D. M. (2011) The Philosophy of Software: Code and Mediation in the Digital Age. London: Palgrave Macmillan, pp 216. ISBN 978-0230244184, Pp. 216.
- Berry, D. M. (2008) Copy, Rip, Burn: The Politics of Copyleft and Open Source. London: Pluto Press, pp 270. ISBN 978-0745324142, pp. 270.

As editor

- Berry, D. M. and Dieter, M. (eds.) (2015) Postdigital Aesthetics: Art, Computation and Design, Palgrave Macmillan. ISBN 978-1137437198, Pp. 300.
- Berry, D. M. (ed.) (2012) Life in Code and Software, Open Humanities Press. ISBN 978-1607852834.
- Berry, D. M. (ed.) (2012) Understanding Digital Humanities. London: Palgrave Macmillan, pp. 318, ISBN 978-0230292659.

== Discography ==
=== Albums ===
Year	Band	Catalogue Number	Title
2001	Meme	LOCA003	Eudaimonia: Released: 6 July 2001; Label: Loca Records; Formats: CD
2001	Meme and Tome	MIRROR01	Invisible: Released: 1 June 2001; Label: Mirrordisc Recordings; Formats: Vinyl LP
2002	Ward	LOCA004	It's Not Necessarily Your Height It Could Be Your Feet: Released: 1 May 2002; Label: Loca Records; Formats: CD
2003	Meme	LOCA006	Affectivity: Released: 12 September 2003; Label: Loca Records; Formats: CD
2005	Ward	LOCA009	It Might Be Useful For Us To Know: Released: 1 June 2005; Label: Loca Records; Formats: CD

=== EPs ===
Year	Band	Catalogue Number	Title
1999	Meme	LOCA001	Kinematic EP: Released: 1 May 1999; Label: Loca Records; Formats: Vinyl EP
1999	Meme	LOCA002	Mandibles EP: Released: 14 Nov 1999; Label: Loca Records; Formats: Vinyl EP
2003	ML	LOCA005	ML EP: Released: 1 Mar 2003; Label: Loca Records; Formats: Vinyl EP
2004	Meme vs Xan	LOCA008	24 EP: Released: 1 March 2004; Label: Loca Records; Formats: CD EP
2019	ØxØ	TRNT003	mythologies EP: Released: 1 Oct 2019; Label: Truant Recordings; Formats: Cassette Tape

=== Singles ===
Year	Band	Catalogue Number	Title
2002	Ward	VAN 36	Sesquipedalian Origins: Released: 1 Apr 2002; Label: Static Caravan Recording; Formats: 33 7" Blue Vinyl
2004	Ward	VAN 64	De Fernius/Armonica or Something: Released: 1 May 2004; Label: Static Caravan Recording; Formats: Lathe Ltd 7" Vinyl
