= Open-source record label =

Type of record label

Open-source record labels are record labels that release music under copyleft licenses, that is, licenses that allow free redistribution and may allow free modification of the tracks.

They present free, libre, and open content, and present this a part of the freedoms of expression and speech, with the goal of opening up the possibilities of media through open collaboration. Some musicians dislike corporate control of music via means of copyright and believe that creativity requires that musicians reappropriate and reinterpret music and sounds to enable them to create truly innovative music. Additionally, copyleft enables musicians to develop music collaboratively.

== Examples of open-source labels ==
- 50/50innertainment Records
- Club Late Music
- Calabash Music
- Loca Records
- Magnatune
- OnClassical
- Opsound
- Voidance Records

Some other labels, like NoCopyrightSounds, give broad royalty-free licenses which is open content.

== See also ==
- Open Content
- Creative Commons licenses
- Jamendo
