= Calabash (disambiguation) =

Calabash, Lagenaria siceraria, is a vine grown for its fruit.

Calabash may also refer to:

== Plants ==
- Calabaza, a winter squash grown in the West Indies, tropical America, and the Philippines
- Crescentia, the calabash trees native to North America
- Sweet Calabash, Passiflora maliformis, a passionfruit

== Other ==
- Calabash (percussion), African percussion instrument made out of a calabash
- Calabash Music, a record label
- Calabash, North Carolina, a town in North Carolina, and a way of preparing seafood
- Calabash Nebula, a nebula 1.4 light years long 5,000 light years from Earth
- Calabash Bay, a region in Saint Elizabeth Parish, Jamaica
- Calabash pipe, a style of smoking pipe
- USS Calabash (SP-108), a United States Navy patrol boat in commission in 1917
