= Slau =

American musician

- Слау
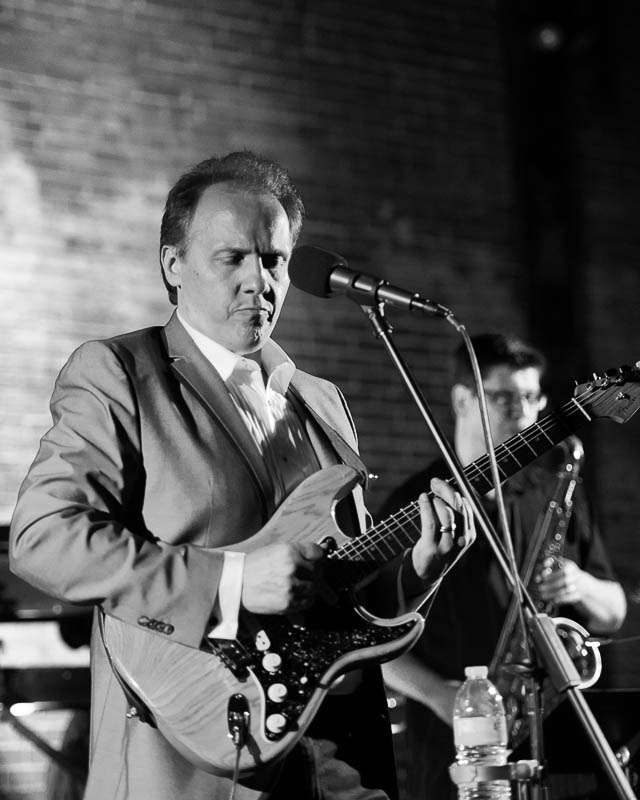
- Slau performing with The Blue Turtles on June 20, 2014
- Occupation: singer-songwriter

Slau (also known as Slavko Halatyn (Note: Ukrainian: Славко Галатин, romanized: Slavko Halatyn) and Jerry Halatyn) is an American singer/songwriter and producer of Ukrainian descent living in New York City. He is best known in the podcasting and podsafe music world for producing the Podsafe for Peace holiday anthem "If Every Day Were Christmas".

In the mid-1980s, Halatyn partnered with Darka Konopada to form Darka and Slavko and became one of the most popular duos in Ukrainian diaspora and Ukraine. Their partnership began a ten-year musical collaboration as well as an eight-year marriage.

On June 20, 2014, Halatyn debuted as the lead singer of The Blue Turtles, a Sting tribute band, at the Ice House in Bethlehem, Pennsylvania.

== Podsafe for Peace ==
In 2005, Slau produced and co-wrote a version of "If Every Day Were Christmas," a holiday song which fell into the hands of podcasting legend Adam Curry. After listening to the song, Curry suggested on his Daily Source Code podcast that the song would lend itself to a "We Are the World"–style production. Slau agreed and began assembling a group of podsafe artists, many from the Podsafe Music Network. The final recording features 32 artists from nine countries around the world and was dubbed "Podsafe for Peace" by Curry. All proceeds from the sale of the recording go to UNICEF.
