= Ram Samudrala =

American academic

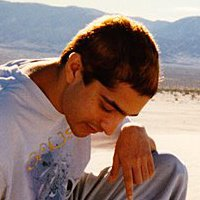
- Born: March 23, 1972 (age 54)
- Education: Ohio Wesleyan University, University of Maryland, Stanford University
- Known for: Small molecule interactomics, protein structure prediction, free music philosophy
- Awards: Searle Scholar (2002); TR100 (2003); NSF Career Award (2005); NIH Director's Pioneer Award (2010)
- Scientific career
- Fields: Computational biology
- Workplaces: University at Buffalo, University of Washington
- Doctoral advisor: John Moult
- Other academic advisors: Michael Levitt
- Website: ram.org compbio.org

Ram Samudrala is a professor of computational biology and bioinformatics at the University at Buffalo, United States. He researches protein folding, structure, function, interaction, design, and evolution.

== Education and career ==
Samudrala received his undergraduate degrees in Computing Science and Genetics from Ohio Wesleyan University as a Wesleyan Scholar, and completed his Ph.D. in Computational Biology with John Moult at the University of Maryland in 1997 as a Life Technologies Fellow.

From 1997-2000, he was a postdoctoral fellow with Michael Levitt at Stanford University. In 2001, Samudrala became the first faculty member to be recruited to the University of Washington under the Advanced Technology Initiative in Infectious Diseases created by the Washington State Legislature "as a bridge between cutting-edge research and education, and new economic activity." He was promoted to associate professor in 2006. In 2014, he became professor and chief of the Division of Bioinformatics at the State University of New York, Buffalo.

== Research ==
Samudrala's research focuses on proteomics and he has regularly taken part in the CASP protein structure prediction challenges since their inception. His work with Moult and Levitt are among the first improvements of blinded protein structure prediction in both comparative and template free modelling categories. With Moult, he was the first to develop and apply probabilistic and graph-theoretic methods to accurately predict interactions for comparative modelling of protein structures. With Levitt, he developed a combined hierarchical approach for de novo structure prediction as well as the Decoys 'R' Us database to evaluate discrimination functions.

At the University of Washington, Samudrala's research group developed a series of algorithms and web server modules to predict protein structure, function, and interactions known as Protinfo. The group then applied these methods to organismal proteomes, creating a framework known as the Bioverse for exploring the relationships among the atomic, molecular, genomic, proteomic, systems, and organismal worlds. The Bioverse framework performs analyses and predictions based on genomic sequence data to annotate and understand the interaction of protein sequence, structure, and function, both at the single molecule as well as at the systems levels. The framework was used to annotate the finished rice genome sequence published in 2005.

Samudrala's group has also applied these methods to drug discovery, resulting in the Computational Analysis of Novel Drug Opportunities (CANDO) platform which ranks therapeutics for all indications by performing multiscale analytics of compound-proteome interaction signatures. A combination of novel docking methods and/or its use in the CANDO platform has led to prospectively validated predictions of putative drugs against dengue, dental caries, herpes, lupus, and malaria along with indication-specific collaborators.

Other areas of application include predicting HIV drug resistance/susceptibility; nanobiotechnology, where small multifunctional peptides that bind to inorganic substrates are designed computationally; and interactomics of several organisms, including the Nutritious Rice for the World (NRW) project.

== Awards and honours ==
Samudrala received a Searle Scholar Award which funds exceptional young scientists in 2002 and was named one of the world's top young innovators (TR100) by MIT Technology Review in 2003, In 2005, he received a NSF CAREER Award which recognizes "outstanding scientists and engineers who show exceptional potential for leadership at the frontiers of knowledge". In 2008, he received the Alberta Heritage Foundation for Medical Research Visiting Scientist Award and was awarded honorary diplomas from the cities of Casma and Yautan, Peru, for his work on vaccine discovery. In 2010, he received the NIH Director's Pioneer Award for the CANDO drug discovery platform. In 2019, Samudrala was presented with a NIH NCATS ASPIRE Design Challenge Award, which was followed by a NIH NCATS ASPIRE Reduction-to-Practice Award grand prize presented in 2022.

== Personal life ==
Samudrala is also a musician who has published and recorded work under the pseudonym TWISTED HELICES. In 1994, he published the Free music Philosophy, which predicted how the ease of copying and transmitting digital information by the Internet would lead to unprecedented violations of copyright laws and new models of distribution for music and other digital media. His work in this area was reported as early as 1997 by diverse media outlets including Billboard, and The New York Times.
