= Loca Records =

British independent electronica and post rock record label

Loca Records is a British independent electronica and post rock record label based in Brighton, England. All the music, artwork and videos are released under copyleft licenses and distributed physically on vinyl, CD, and cassette. Inspired by the free software movement, Loca Records allows similar freedoms as the GNU General Public License on their releases, including copying, re-release, modification, and sampling, with the requirement that the new work uses the same license.

== Artists ==
The roster of artists releasing work on LOCA Records includes the following;

- Dot
- Meme (David Meme)
- Maz Plant Out (Marion Bouyssonnade – chant, corps sonores; Fleur Galasso – piano, guitare, chant; Mylène Duhec – basse, violoncelle; Widad Abdessemed – violon; Laurent Bouyssonade – batterie)
- ML
- OJN (currently released on Arkward Silence)
- Snø
- Ward (David Meme and Richard Williams, also released on Static Caravan)
- Xan (featuring Lisa Elle from Dark Horses)

== Licensing ==
Loca's first and second release in 1999, Kinematic and the Mandibles EP, were released under the GNU General Public License and subsequent releases have been on the EFF Open Audio License. Loca is now releasing all work under the Creative Commons license known as the Creative Commons Attribution-ShareAlike License.

One notable difference between the Creative Commons license and free/open source licenses, such as the GPL, is that it does not require making the raw unmixed tracks available, whereas free/open source software has the underlying source code available. Loca is planning a true free content/open source release with the new ML album which will contain a selection of samples used to make the track along with the music on a computer-readable data section of the CD.

== Finance ==
Loca receives money from selling CDs and Records. Following the example of free and open source software distributors, this money is reinvested in new talent and to encourage more experimentation.

== Discography ==
=== Albums ===
- LOCA003 Eudaimonia Meme (2001)
- LOCA004 It's Not Necessarily Your Height It Could Be Your Feet Ward (2002)
- LOCA006 Affectivity Meme (2003)
- LOCA009 It Might Be Useful For Us To Know Ward (2005)

=== Singles and EPs ===
- LOCA001 Kinematic EP Meme (1999)
- LOCA002 Mandibles EP Meme (2001)
- LCOA005 ML ML (2003)
- LOCA007 Chansons Pour Pendus EP Maz Plant Out (2004)
- LOCA008 24 EP Meme versus Xan (2004)

=== Music videos ===
- LOCA00A Invisible (Meme). 2002. Directed by Dan Knight
- LOCA00B Beautiful (Meme). 2003 Directed by Laurent King
- LOCA00C Heavy Artillery (ML). 2003. Directed by Pedro Inoue
- LOCA00D Automotive Hydraulic (ML). 2003. Directed by Matthias Hilner
- LOCA00E Generating Civil Society (Ward). 2005. Directed by David Meme

== See also ==
- Open source record label
- Copyleft
- List of record labels
