= Dogmazic =

Free music online archive

- Launch date: December 2004
- Platform: Platform independent
- Pricing model: Free
- Availability: WorldWide
- Website: www.dogmazic.net

Dogmazic is one of the primary free music download managers in France. Dogmazic was created in December 2004 by the Bordeaux-based Association Musique libre!, a major proponent of the French free music movement.

Dogmazic's database contains roughly 2000 artists, largely but not exclusively from France. All of Dogmazic's music is licensed under terms that permit free redistribution, such as Creative Commons licenses and the Free Art License.

Dogmazic does not carry any advertising.

== History ==
Launched on 10 June 2004, Dogmazic, called musique-libre.org until September 2006, was, until December 2012, a platform of downloading music under an open license. The site offered artists to spread their creations online, on the condition that these works are covered by one of the licenses applicable to the music. Labels promoting artists in “Freestyle” could also register on the site to discover their artists’ catalogues of music. In November 2011, the full catalogue of Dogmazic included 51,066 pieces by 4,406 bands and 325 labels under 35 different licenses.

The site currently offers a blog devoted to music, free news on culture and a discussion forum.

Archive music was unavailable from December 2012 to May 2015.

The platform is based on Ampache.

== The Association Musique Libre! ==
The Association Musique Libre! was created in Bordeaux at the end of December 2004. This was followed by the opening of a Lyon branch in 2006. The goal of the Association Musique Libre! is to promote and distribute the work of independent artists within the framework of the Free Art license.

The Association lobbies on behalf of non-trading companies and artists in the recording industry. It also aims to inform both artists and the public about the Free Art License and Internet distribution models. Also, for ethical reasons, Dogmazic chooses to completely refuse any financial support to their company through advertising, instead preferring donations from visitors and self-financing from within their community.

In France, Dogzamic have recently been conflicting with SACEM, who disagree with some of the licensing of the music uploaded to the website. Some people who work with Dogmazic are putting forward the idea of a more open licensing order from SACEM, creating a peaceful merging of open licensing outside of the traditional production of music in the record industry.
