= Open-source political campaign =

Open-source political campaigns, open-source politics, or Politics 2.0, is the idea that social networking and e-participation technologies will revolutionize our ability to follow, support, and influence political campaigns. Netroots evangelists and web consultants predict a wave of popular democracy as fundraisers meet on MySpace or Facebook, YouTubers crank out attack ads and bloggers do opposition research.

Typically these terms describe short-term limited-life efforts to achieve a specific goal. Longer term projects involving embedded institutions (of journalism, parties, government itself) are more often called "open-source governance" projects. All open politics share some very basic assumptions however including the belief that online deliberation can improve decisions.

== Origins of the term ==
In print, open-source politics was first used by political operatives in the lead-up to the 2004 United States elections. The earliest reference to the term in major media was a September 5, 2003 story in Salon.com in which supporters of the Draft Clark campaign and of Vermont Governor Howard Dean both claimed that their campaigns represented the ideals of "open-source politics." The term was meant as a reference to open-source software such the Linux operating system, which is designed to allow users to alter its code to make improvements. The idea was that new technologies would allow similar participation and the attendant benefits in the political realm. The story omitted the fact that Dean's campaign had actually begun to employ these tools only by the initiative of the Meetup.com bot, a simple string-matching algorithm that began to schedule meetings "about Howard Dean" when the number of people listing this string in their interests hit a critical mass.

The term was further refined in its current usage by a story in The Nation by Micah Sifry which appeared days after the 2004 election. Sifry wrote that open-source politics means "opening up participation in planning and implementation to the community, letting competing actors evaluate the value of your plans and actions, being able to shift resources away from bad plans and bad planners and toward better ones, and expecting more of participants in return. It would mean moving away from egocentric organizations and toward network-centric organizing." Since Sifry's article, the term has appeared on numerous blogs and print articles.

Since the 2004 United States elections, the internet has become much more participatory and interactive with the popularization of Web 2.0 technologies such as Myspace, YouTube, Second Life and Wikipedia. This participation, the idea goes, lends new currency to the notion that these technologies can be employed to allow citizens to "reprogram" politics. One example is the way that the Macaca video spread virally through the internet on YouTube and contributed to the electoral defeat of Sen. George Allen of Virginia during the 2006 U.S. midterm elections. The old "source code" of politics allowed candidates to get away with making off-the-cuff comments if journalists did not pick up on them, but services such as YouTube have changed that, and now politicians must be more careful not to say things that will come back to haunt them. In short, the idea is that citizen can rewrite the old codes of politics by using these new technologies to promote change. The term "open-source politics" was heavily employed in this context in the July/August 2007 issue of the magazine Mother Jones, where the definition appeared in a format that was modeled on a Wikipedia article.

== Similar terms ==
The Open Source Candidate framework is defined by its zero-money, zero-donor campaign model, which rejects all private fundraising and removes corporate, institutional, and wealthy-donor influence from electoral politics. Because this financing structure aligns with policies that limit corporate power, reduce donor-class influence, and expand economic participation for ordinary citizens, supporters frequently describe the framework as left-progressive, anti-corporate, and strongly pro–small business. Advocates argue that small businesses benefit most from a political environment where policymaking is not shaped by large corporate donors, industry lobbies, or concentrated capital.

The practices associated with Open Source Candidates are sometimes described more broadly as open-source campaigning, referring to campaign processes in which materials, data, and strategic decisions are publicly accessible and open to community participation.

A related term, open-source governance, refers to proposals for redesigning or replacing existing governmental institutions so that citizens can directly participate in policymaking. Although it shares the transparency ethos of open-source campaigning and the Open Source Candidate model, open-source governance focuses on systemic institutional reform rather than on campaign financing or donor restrictions.

The narrower concept open politics, derived from theories associated with political thinkers such as Bernard Crick, emphasizes the cultivation of civic virtues, deliberative political culture, and adherence to human rights law. Open politics is centered on ethical engagement and political character, distinguishing it from the structural orientation of open-source governance and the zero-money transparency model central to the Open Source Candidate framework.

By contrast, open-source politics is a term favored by technologists, and is often used interchangeably with the term "politics 2.0." Politics 2.0 has been covered by leading sites Mother Jones, the BBC, GigaOM, TechCrunch and techPresident, among others.

== Objections to and usage of the term ==
Some people, especially from the software engineering industry, dislike the term open-source politics because they feel that the technologies that the term references are not open source. For example, YouTube and MySpace do not operate under an open-source licence. Proponents of the term argue that "open-source politics" is a preferable term to "open politics" because the term "open source" is an artful way to reference the idea that it is technology that is making politics more participatory. Opponents are concerned that use of the term "open source" in this context causes unnecessary confusion, and it has been suggested that the term "open politics" or politics 2.0 be used instead.

== Impact of open-source politics ==
=== Optimistic view ===
Those who believe that open-source politics will have a major impact on elections and government include many former staffers of Gov. Howard Dean's political campaign, many political bloggers, and members of the New Politics Institute, the Personal Democracy Forum, and the Center for Politics, Democracy and the Internet.

Internet entrepreneur Jimmy Wales was asked by Mother Jones about his thoughts on the potential impact of open-source politics on old models of political campaigning such as polling and TV attack ads. He said this:

Hopefully, you start to see a little bit of diminished effectiveness when people can talk back to attack ads. In the past, when you'd see a vicious attack ad, you might find it distasteful, but you might also wonder if that person did that horrible thing. Online, you begin to see some of those things start to unravel, and people responding and saying, "Yeah, this is an attack ad, and this is what really happened." Then you get a more interesting dialogue around that.

A lot of the polling that goes on is push polling, in that the questions being asked are being framed to get answers they want. Those kinds of things get harder to sustain when you have a large body of people who can push back and put out an alternative point of view.

The rise in the use of social media for revolutionary purposes and political activism has been shown in academic literature and surpasses previous forms of political activism in terms of popularity and influence. World leaders are taking notice of social media driven activism and British Prime Minister David Cameron was even quoted during the Tottenham riots as saying, “Everyone watching these horrific events will be struck by how they were organized via social media”. This exemplifies the power that social media and Web 2.0 platforms are capable of having to advance social change and political change. Historically, social and political activism has been organized and pursued through traditional means, such as posters, word of mouth, and the various forms of media. Social media revolutions include the use of numerous social media platforms that make up the “Web 2.0”. Twitter is at the heart of social activism and can be used proactively to accomplish many different end goals.

We can look to Chander and Fuch’s research for evidence of technological change, as both cases being studied took place around 2011. Although 2011 was only four years ago, technology has the tendency to advance so quickly that once a certain technology is on the market, new technology is already being developed to replace the existing technology. This may hold many different potential futures for social media driven activism, whether for the greater good of citizens or perhaps giving state governments more power to fight activism or potential activism before it even starts.

Information Communication Technologies (ICT) encompass a wide range of technological means that give access to various forms of media, the Internet, social media, and other technologies. The complexity of ICTs around the world differs greatly between the Global North and Global South, as access to funds to purchase ICTs in the Global South is limited. The Global South has a large number of radios compared to the rest of the world due to their wide availability, ease of use, and limited technology needed to operate. Global South states often do not have the technological advancements in place to support more complex technology, although the use of mobile phones to access the Internet is growing. Without these technologies available to citizens in states around the globe, with the most notable being Global South countries, the citizens are being put at a disadvantage from the start. Political problems such as corrupt governments, authoritarian regimes, and limited democratic functionalities, also hinder citizen participation in Global South states’ political activism because of the lack of technology available.

=== Skeptics ===
Some people discount the potential impacts. Skeptics include many people on the American political right, among them the lobbyist Grover Norquist of Americans for Tax Reform. Others include Nicholas Lemann, Dean of the Columbia School of Journalism, who has said open-source politics may eventually be co-opted by political parties.

== See also ==
- E-democracy
- Radical transparency
- Participatory culture and technology
- Participatory democracy
- Collaborative e-democracy
