= Libre.fm =

Music listening tracking service

- Website type: Music, Statistics & Community
- Available in: Multilingual
- Owners: Matt Lee and Rhea Myers
- Creator: GNU Project
- Website: libre.fm
- Commercial: Yes / Free software
- Registration: Required, Free
- Launched: 1 April 2009
- Current status: Open

Libre.fm is a music community website that aims to provide a free software replacement for Last.fm. The website was founded in 2009 by Matt Lee.

Libre.fm can optionally store a user's listening habits using information sent to the website's server from the user's audio player via scrobbling. In order to enable support for Libre.fm on existing audio players, the website implements the Last.fm Audioscrobbler API. In addition to collecting user uploaded listening data, the site offers streaming music using the Ogg container, from the sites Jamendo or The Internet Archive, via an HTML5 audio player, run directly in the user's browser.

By utilizing the records of users' listening habits, the website aims to be able to recommend music to users by analyzing their musical taste. However, this feature is not yet fully developed. The site currently only offers basic suggestions if content a user has "Loved" (favorited) contains shared tags with content a user has not yet favourited. Registered users who have favourited tracks will have that content appear in streaming web playlists called "Radio Stations". It is not currently possible to build custom playlists.

A goal of the project is to encourage artists to release tracks under a free license, and allow users to download or purchase these tracks. Only artists releasing music under free content licenses are promoted by the site. The site will also allow users to communicate among themselves, create groups of common interests and share information on musical events.

The main reasoning behind the foundation of Libre.fm was to provide a service similar to Last.fm that respects the privacy of its users and their information. As such, Libre.fm does not log users' IP addresses and does not claim ownership of users' data.

Libre.fm is powered by the free software package GNU FM, created for the project.

Libre.fm closed temporarily on May 28, 2025, with account registration shut down and the website put into maintenance mode, then re-opened on November 13, 2025, with new design. On April 12, 2026, Lee posted an update to the /r/last.fm Reddit page, announcing that Libre.fm was once again open, and new users could import and sync their Last.fm libraries.
