= George Hrab =

American musician and podcaster (born 1971)

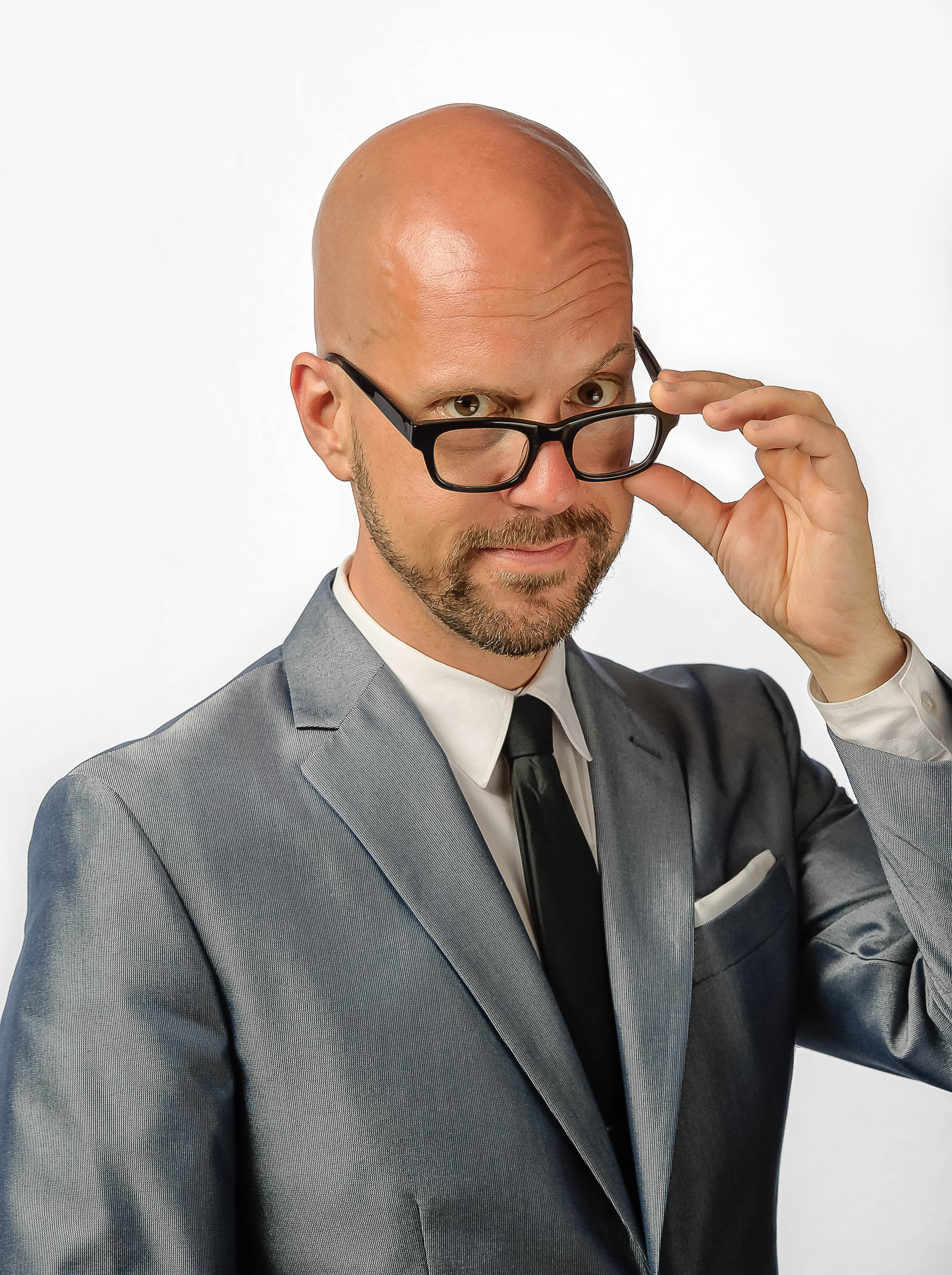
- Hrab in 2016

Background information
- Born: 1970 or 1971 (age 55–56); Belleville, New Jersey, U.S.
- Origin: Bethlehem, Pennsylvania, U.S.
- Genres: Progressive rock, funk
- Occupations: Musician, songwriter, podcaster, author
- Instruments: Drums, guitar, bass, piano
- Years active: 1995–present
- Label: Geologic Records
- Website: GeorgeHrab.com
- George Hrab's voice recorded in October 2016

George Joseph Hrab is an American drummer, guitarist, composer and podcaster known for performing rock, funk and jazz and for exploring atheist, skeptic and science themes in his work. He has released nine albums as a solo artist.

== Early life and education ==
Hrab was born in Belleville, New Jersey and grew up speaking Ukrainian and surrounded by Ukrainian culture. In 1989, he graduated from Montclair Kimberley Academy in Montclair, New Jersey.

== Career ==
Hrab performs in several genres of music, but most often in rock and funk. His songs often reflect his interest in science and skepticism. Hrab lists Frank Zappa and David Byrne as key influences. "You can shake your ass to it, but it's still really smart and interesting," he says. He has described his style of music with one word: Philosophunk! "I’m a big fan of Frank Zappa, Talking Heads, XTC, the Beatles, and things like that. Those are my influences, but at the same time, I’m a huge fan of Stan Freberg and James Randi and Michael Shermer and those kinda guys. So it’s sort of like philosophy and music… What I do is I coalesce the vapors of the universe."

Hrab has released nine albums since 1997 as an independent musician. One of Hrab's approaches as an independent artist is to customize the packaging of each his albums. One features a tin box, one in a DVD case, etc. "Each one stands out as a piece of art, giving his fans a genuine reason to buy the physical disc as merchandise, not just a music holder." Two of his albums have won ADDY Awards for their packaging.

Aside from his solo work, Hrab has been a member of many bands over the course of his career.

=== Eric Mintel Quartet ===
In 1998, Hrab was the touring drummer for the Eric Mintel Quartet, and recorded one jazz album with them. The highlight of this tour was when the group played "cool '50s swing" at the Kennedy Center in Washington, D.C. and at a White House Christmas party.

=== Philadelphia Funk Authority ===
Hrab's job is playing drums for a Philadelphia-area based band called the Philadelphia Funk Authority. The nine-member band was formed in 1999 and plays corporate, private, and club shows in the region around Philadelphia and also tours nationwide. The group has shared the stage with Elton John and other acts.

==== Band members ====
- Gary Rivenson – Band Leader, Bass Guitar
- Andy Kowal – Trumpet
- George Hrab – Drums, Vocals
- Dale Gerheart – Lead Vocals, Trombone
- Larry Ogden – Saxophones
- Jill Gaudious – Lead Vocals
- Andy Portz – Guitar, Vocals
- Dave Burt – Keyboards
- Vinnie Puccio – Bass
- Marijo Burns – Lead Vocals
- Ross Brown – Percussion

=== Geologic Orchestra ===
When performing his own material with a band, Hrab has called the group the Geologic Orchestra. The band is made up of some members of the Philadelphia Funk Authority and other musicians, and has played in a seven-piece configuration among others.

=== Trebuchet ===
Hrab's sixth independent album Trebuchet was released in June 2010. As a means of promoting the album, he offered the full album to any podcast who wanted to run it, uncut, in their feed. Many podcasts such as Skepticality, American Freethought and We Are Not Delicious took him up on his offer. The album is available as a conventional CD and digital download.

=== Styrofoam Tour ===
From November 26 – December 5, 2010, Hrab embarked on an entirely fan-organized tour of Australia and New Zealand. The tour began with appearances at The Amazing Meeting Australia, a skeptical and freethinker conference co-sponsored by the Australian Skeptics and the James Randi Educational Foundation. In ten days, Hrab played in four Australian states, the Australian Capital Territory and the north and south islands of New Zealand.

The tour was named "Styrofoam" after a malapropism created as an inside joke by Kylie Sturgess.

=== The Blue Turtles ===
In September 2013, Hrab announced the inception of The Blue Turtles, a band formed to cover Sting's first solo album, The Dream of the Blue Turtles. The debut performance was July 20, 2014 at the Ice House in Bethlehem, Pennsylvania as a part of the Ice House Tonight concert series.

==== Band members ====
- Slau Halatyn – Vocals, Guitar
- George Hrab – Drums
- Neil Wetzel – Saxophone
- Vinnie Puccio – Bass
- CJ Steinway – Keyboards
- Alisa B. Anderson – Vocals
- Kiera Wilhelm – Vocals

=== Occasional Songs for the Periodic Table ===
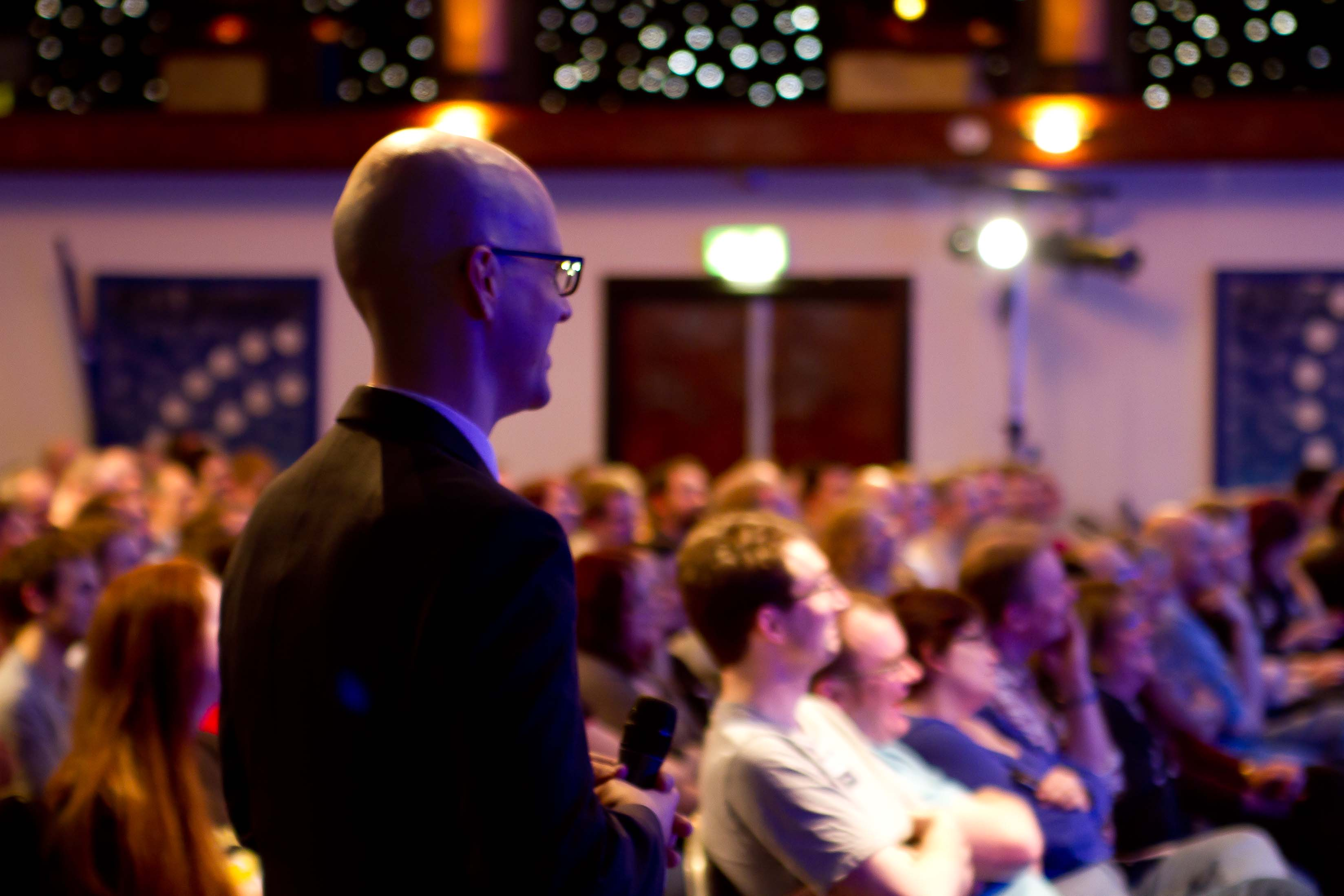
Hrab in 2011

In 2015, Hrab performed Occasional Songs for the Periodic Table as a part of the Ice House Tonight series in Bethlehem, Pennsylvania. While Hrab previously performed the album on his podcast, and live in an abbreviated version in Las Vegas, this was the first time the entire concert was performed live. The concert consisted of a song written and performed by Hrab for each of the 118 elements on the Periodic Table.

=== The Broad Street Score ===
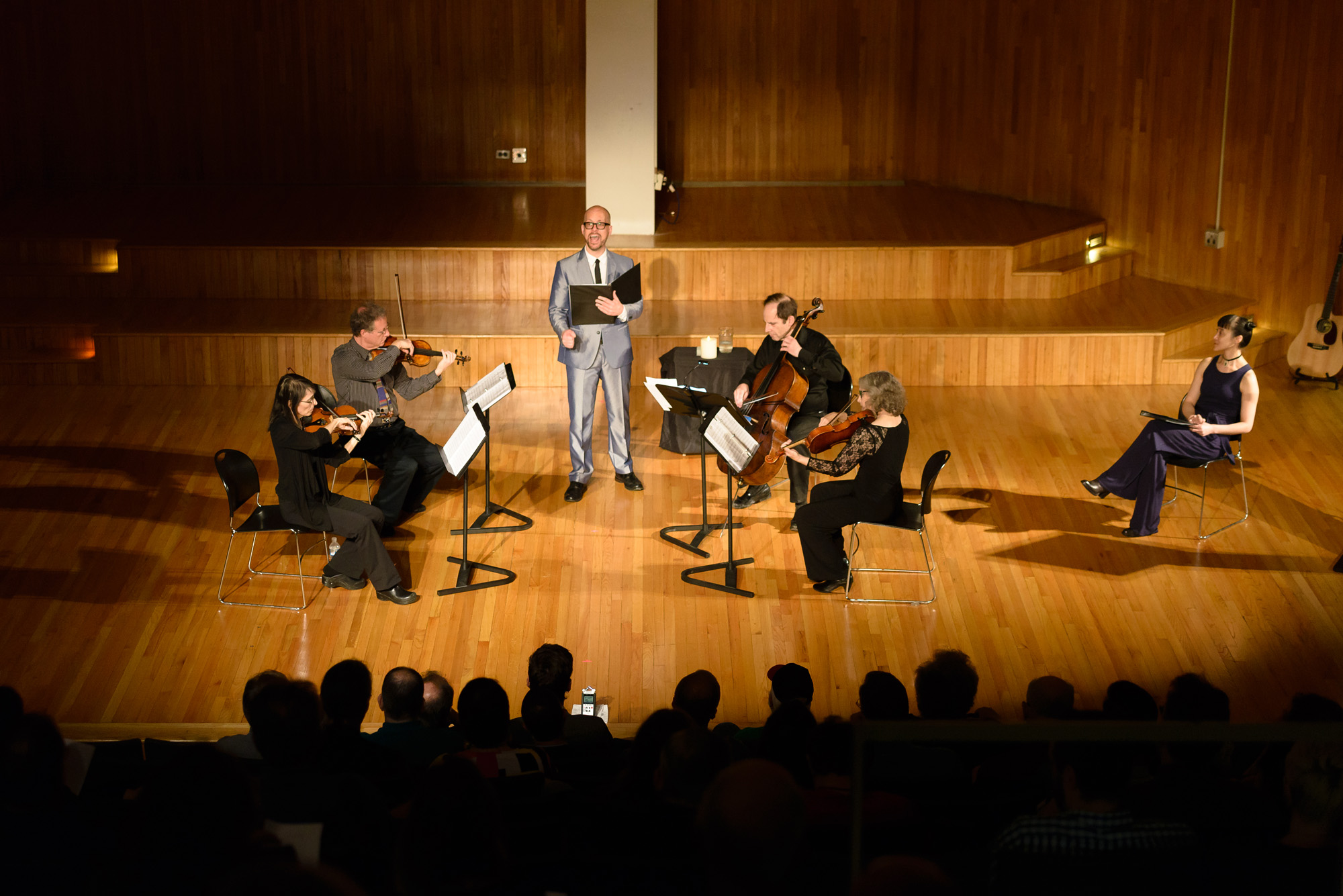
Hrab performing at The Broad Street Score in New York City in May 2016

In 2016, Hrab performed a greatest hits concert featuring string Quartet versions of songs from five of his albums at the Ice House in Bethlehem, Pennsylvania. During the concert, Hrab performed with the Rittenhouse String Quartet. Together they performed arrangements of Hrab’s songs arranged by Veikko Rihu and Slau Halatyn

In 2016, Hrab reprised The Broad Street Score at the Fashion Institute of Technology’s, Katie Murphy Amphitheater as part of the annual NECSS conference. The show made its international debut on August 24, 2016 in Turku, Finland.

== Podcasting ==
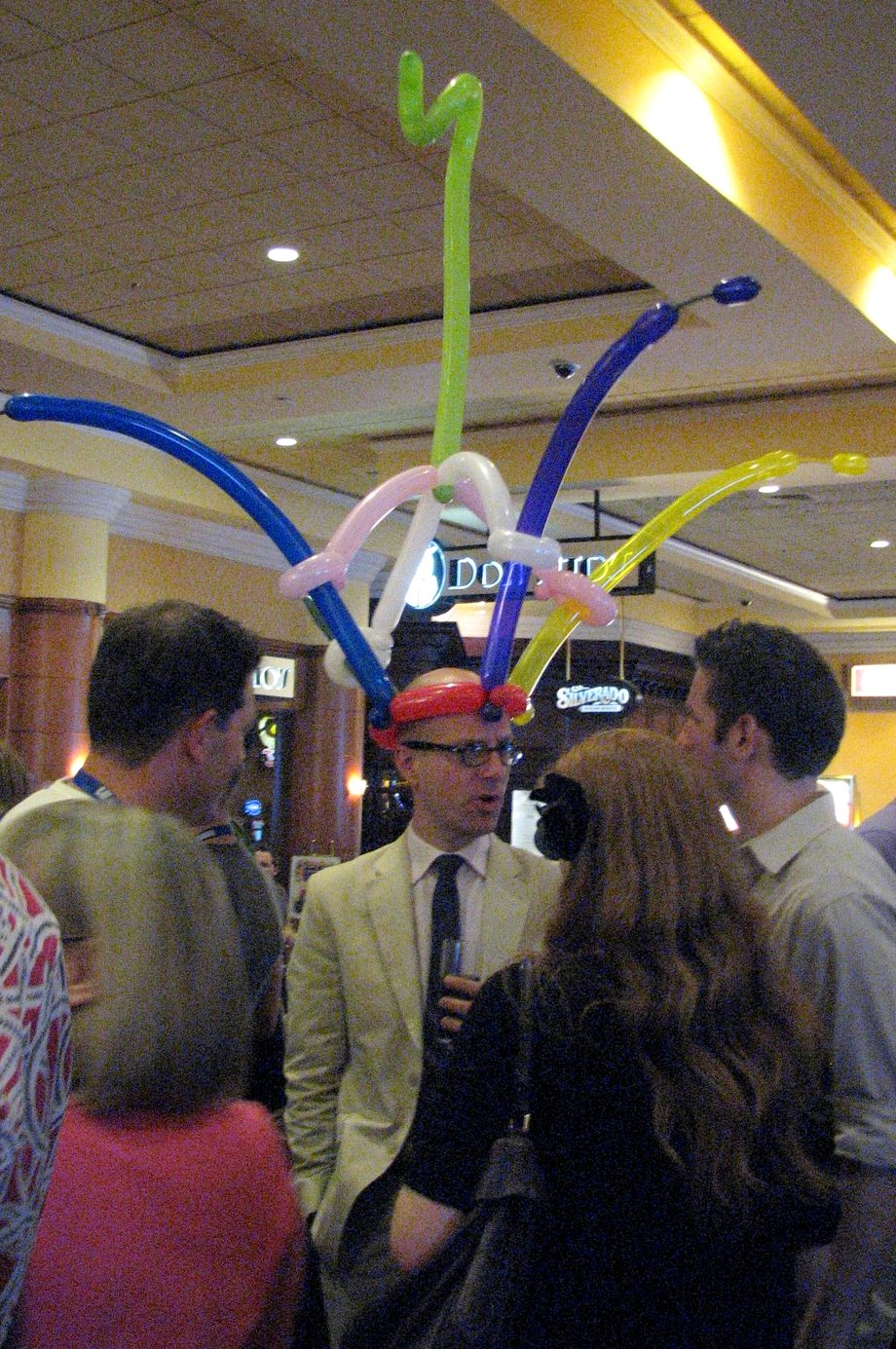
Hrab with fans at James Randi Educational Foundation's The Amazing Meeting in July 2009

After being featured on the podcast Skepticality, Hrab was invited by its hosts to Dragon Con in 2006. There he performed and met many podcasters who became interested in featuring his music. He credits this exposure for worldwide interest in his music. "Folks from Australia and Singapore who should have no idea who I am have downloaded songs and bought albums. That is purely due to podcasts," Hrab said.

In the summer of 2006, Hrab hosted a weekly program called The Geologic Radio Hour on the Lehigh University radio station WLVR-FM. Listed as "free form eclectic" and running at midnight on Tuesdays, it featured spoken word segments and a number of comedy sketches developed by Hrab.

Based on the experience of the radio program and the contacts made in podcasting in 2006, and encouraged by his friend and producer Slau, Hrab launched his own podcast in February 2007.

=== Geologic podcast ===
The Geologic Podcast is a weekly podcast consisting of personal stories, comedy sketches, news commentary, music and interviews, starring Hrab. The content often draws from Hrab's musical career, the music industry in general and from topics that relate to skepticism, atheism, rationalism and humanism. The title is a pun on Hrab's first name and his interest in rationalism; the podcast contains "not a hint of geology". New episodes of the program are posted weekly.

The podcast content varies from week to week, but often includes several of a number of recurring segments. Some are Hrab speaking on a particular topic or relating a story, others are comedy sketches in which Hrab plays characters. Occasionally the podcast will take the form of a concert, with Hrab singing and playing guitar. Hrab celebrated his 44th birthday by covering Yes' album 90125 in its entirety. Hrab has also conducted interviews with musicians such as Slau and Milton Mermikides, as well as others.

In February 2017, Hrab celebrated 10 years of the podcast with an eight-hour 500th episode which was broadcast as video on Facebook Live. The broadcast has featured interviews with Steven Novella, Phil Plait, and Paul Provenza, and others.

==== Segments ====
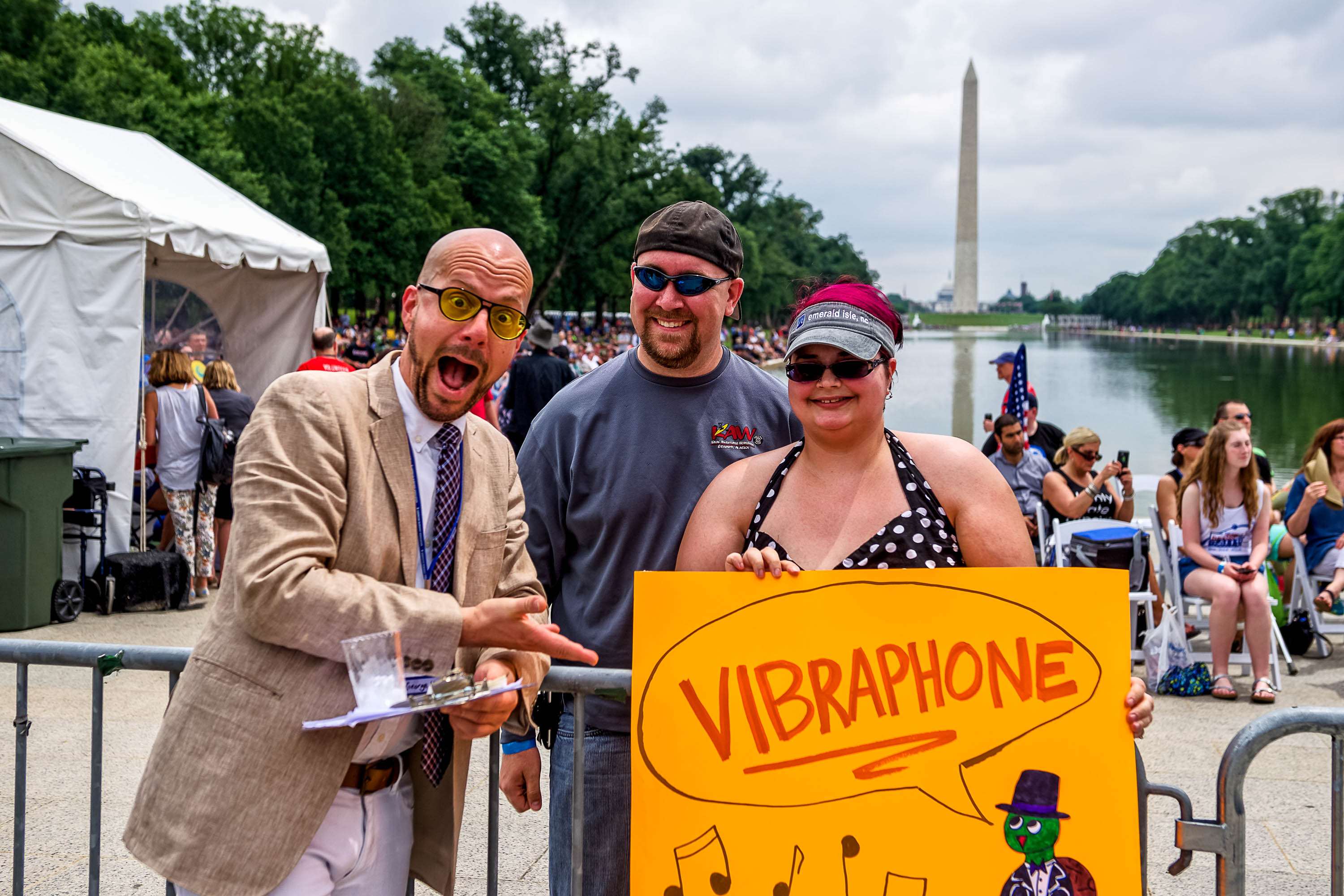
Hrab greets fans at Reason Rally in 2016

- Ask George: Hrab responds to questions from listeners.
- Captivating True Stories from The Adventures of The Philadelphia Funk Authority: Hrab tells a story from a Philadelphia Funk Authority gig.
- Dr. Damian Handzy's Facts That'll Fuck Y'up: A Ukrainian professor (named for a friend of Hrab's) explains bizarre facts from science.
- Geo's Mom Reads Jay-Z Lyrics: Hrab's mother reads the lyrics of Jay-Z songs and chats with Hrab.
- Grandma's Entertainment Report: A Ukrainian grandmother reports entertainment industry news.
- The History Chunk: Hrab recounts (and comically embellishes) notable historic events that occurred on the date of the podcast.
- Horror-scopes: Hrab composes his own demented version of astrological horoscopes.
- Interesting Fauna: News items about unusual animals mentioned in science news.
- Minoishe Interroberg's To Make with the Good English: A Rabbi expounds on grammar and word usage errors.
- Misinformed Science Podcast: A badly researched podcast about science.
- Mortimer: Hrab speaks on the phone with a codger named Mortimer ("I'm old"), who largely ignores him and rants on.
- Readings from notThe Bible: Hrab reads completely bastardized versions of chapters from The Bible.
- Religious Moron of the Week: Hrab laments the excesses committed by religious believers in the news.
- Rupert McClanahan's Indestructible Bastards: A Scottish character recounts news stories of people who simply would not die.
- Science Minute: Hrab explains a recent scientific development.
- So Where Are You Calling From?: Hrab's world traveling "Uncle Thaddeus" calls in and fancifully describes his current location.
- Tell Me Something Good: Hrab recounts a positive news story (in contrast to the constant pandemic news).
- Things People Love that Actually Suck : Hrab explains the negative aspects of sometimes inexplicably popular items, products or trends.
- Weekly Standard: Hrab interpretation of standard songs.

Other than Hrab's mother and the interviews, nearly all the voices on the program are provided by Hrab.

=== Other podcasts ===
Hrab has performed on or has been interviewed by a number of other podcasts, including the Friendly Atheist, Skepticality, The Skeptics' Guide to the Universe, Slacker Astronomy, Sessions with Slau, The Rabbit Zone, The Nonsense Podcast, The Skeptic Zone, Point of Inquiry, Inquiry FM, Artist Connection Podcast, The Pseudo Scientists, Maynard's Malaise, Cognitive Dissonance, The Story Collider, and InKredulous.

Hrab also wrote and recorded the theme song for the 365 Days of Astronomy podcast, FAR. He created and performed in the associated music video.

== TEDx Talk ==
Hrab's TEDx Talk at TEDxLehighRiver on September 19, 2015 was "Rethinking Doubt: The Value and Achievements of Skepticism."

== Reason Rally 2016 ==
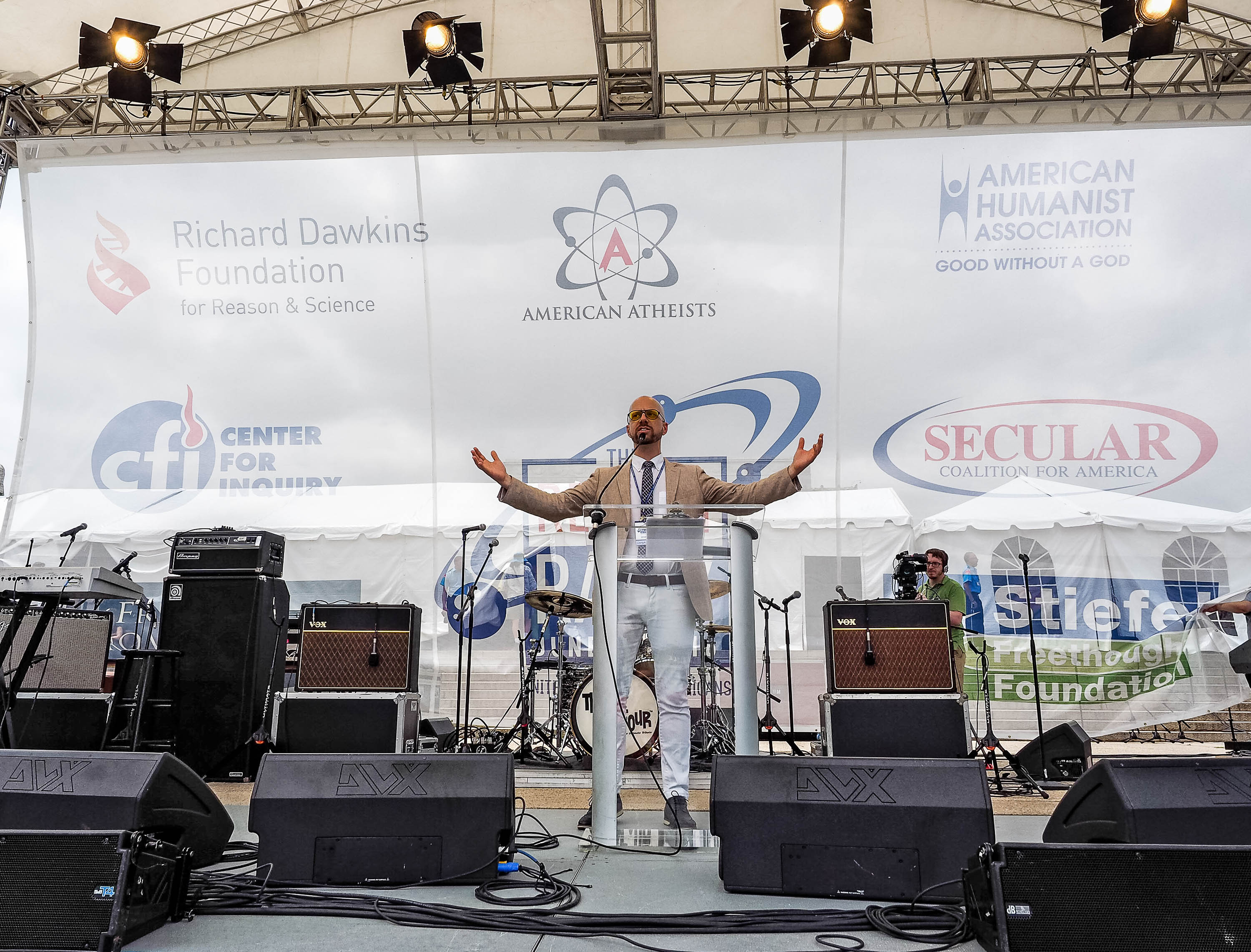
Hrab at Reason Rally in Washington, D.C., in 2016

On June 4, 2016, Hrab served as emcee of Reason Rally in Washington, D.C. On June 5, 2016, Hrab moderated a celebrity panel with Kelly Carlin, John de Lancie, Lawrence Krauss, Paul Provenza, and Dave Rubin at the mini-conference that followed the Reason Rally.

== Awards ==
- Won: Gold Award & Best in Show Print (Sheer Brick Studio for "Interrobang"), 2006 Greater Lehigh Valley ADDY Awards
- Nominated: Best Audio Production (Geologic Podcast), 2007 Parsec Awards
- Won: Best Comedy Podcast (Geologic Podcast), Podcast Peer Awards 5 (Fall 2008)
- Won: Best All Around Performer (tie), 2008 Lehigh Valley Music Awards
- Won: Best Wedding Music (The Philadelphia Funk Authority), 2010 Best of the Philly Hot List
- Won: Gold Award (Sheer Brick Studio for "Trebuchet"), 2011 Greater Lehigh Valley ADDY Awards
- Won: Best Wedding Music (The Philadelphia Funk Authority), 2011 Best of the Philly Hot List
- Won: 20 Year Veteran Award, 2017 Lehigh Valley Music Awards
- Nominated: 2018 Emmy Award, Musical Composition / Arrangement for "The Misconception Song" on Dedham TV (Brian Kerby, Producer; George Hrab, composer)

== Controversy ==
Following the release of sic, Hrab was sued for invasion of privacy by a former supervisor from his job at Moravian College. She claimed that a short phrase written in cyrillic script in the liner notes and one track on the album were intended as a disparaging remark directed at her, which embarrassed her in front of her coworkers. Hrab denied the charges and the case went to trial in January 1999. Hrab lost the case and had to pay damages, and the album was removed from distribution.

Hrab documented the entire affair, including reenacting all of the testimony at trial, on his podcast. In 2006, the album was re-released with the disparaging material removed.

== Personal life ==
Hrab is of Ukrainian Catholic descent and was born in New Jersey. His father (also named George Hrab) is a musician who has performed in a band called Tempo since 1959. Hrab has lived in Bethlehem, Pennsylvania since attending Moravian College, where he received a bachelors in music in 1993. In the summer of 2011, Hrab revealed on his podcast that he is allergic to penicillin.

== Discography and other works ==
- [sic] (1996), Orchard
- [sic] (2006 re-issue), Geologic Records
- Minutiae (1999), Geologic Records
- Vitriol (2001), Geologic Records
- Coelacanth (2003), Geologic Records
- Interrobang (2006), Geologic Records
- Trebuchet (2010), Geologic Records
- 21812 (2013), Geologic Records
- Terpsichore (2023), Geologic Records
- Stocking Stuffer (2024), Geologic Records

=== With others ===
- Ika (1995) – Ika
- Lullaby (1998) – Eric Mintel Quartet
- The Weight of Words (2001) – Slau
- What if Every Day Were Christmas (2006)
- The Christmas Sweaters: Live in Bethlehem (2024)
- The George HraBand: Live at Liederplatz (2025)

=== Publications ===
- Hrab, George (2007). Non-Coloring Book. Geologic Books. p. 168.
- Hrab, George (2014). Spiritual Healing & Balance Through Colonic Regularity: A Cleansing Collection of Essays. Sheer Brick Studio. p. 204. ISBN 978-0692332429.
