= Darka and Slavko =

American musical duo

Darka & Slavko (Ukrainian: Дарка й Славко, romanized: Darka y Slavko) was a popular musical duo of two first-generation Ukrainian Americans based in New York City, Darka Konopada (Ukrainian: Дарка Конопада) and Slavko Halatyn (Ukrainian: Славко Галатин), who met in the mid-1980's through their involvement with a Ukrainian college group's poetry reading for political prisoners. This launched a ten-year musical collaboration as well as an eight-year marriage.

Under the name Darka & Slavko, the duo released four albums and produced various projects for other musicians. Their work focused on creating a sound that combined traditional Ukrainian music with contemporary flavors.

Their first, self-titled album, included a cover of Volodymyr Ivasyuk's "Chervona Ruta", arranged to a reggae beat.

Their second album, Khvylyna, gave way to more sophisticated arrangements, and the duo began to write original songs. In 1995, Darka & Slavko released their final studio album, Povir, which consisted entirely of original compositions. The track "Spivtsi" debuted at Ukraine's first contemporary music festival, Chervona Ruta, in 1989, where the duo and their newly formed group won Favorite International Band.

Darka & Slavko continued to perform around the world, and in addition to their studio work, they also recorded a live album with jazz renditions of their favorite songs. In 1997, the two split up personally and professionally.

Both have continued their music careers. Halatyn recorded an album in 2001, titled The Weight of Words, under the name Slau, and Konopada sings under the name Darka Dusty.

In July 2012, Darka & Slavko agreed to perform a reunion concert at the Ukrainian American Youth Association in Ellenville, New York.

== Discography ==
- Darka & Slavko (1987)
- Khvylyna (Хвилина) (1987)
- Povir (Повір) (1995)
- Unplugged (1995)
- Retro Perspective (2012)
