= Open music =

Music that allows derivative works

Open music is music that is shareable and may provide source files — such as lyrics, MIDI files, samples, track-by-track audio files, or Audacity .AUP project files — allowing meaningful modification. It is the concept of "open source" computer software applied to music. However, the non-commercial stipulation associated with Open Music is incompatible with the first section of the Open Source Definition as well as the first freedom put forth in The Free Software Definition (freedom 0). Open Music is one of the general responses to the RIAA's and governmental actions against the music industry and its consumers.

"Open music" can be considered a subset of "free music" (referring to freedom). The differences of philosophy between advocates of "open source software" and "free software" have not surfaced in the community of musicians contributing music to the copyleft commons. This may be due to the relatively recent emergence of copyleft music, as well as to the fact that software development generally involves much more collaboration and derivatization than does music production. It is not clear that open collaboration using copyleft licenses provides any significant advantages in music production, as open source advocates commonly argue is the case for software development.

Several websites have surfaced to provide musicians with the platform and tools necessary for online music collaboration. Most of these sites promote one or more of the Creative Commons licenses, allowing derivative works and sharing of the finished songs. Early implementations of these collaboration sites relied on threaded discussion forum software and FTP to provide a means for musicians to initiate and discuss projects, and to share multi-track files. More recent and modern sites provide robust project-management features, automatic encoding and compression, online playback streaming, web-based upload and download options, chat, and project-based discussion forums.

There are plenty of artists that use Creative Commons Licenses. One of the most open licences is "Creative Commons Attribution" License.

== Example ==
In 2012, Russian music composer, scientist and Russian Pirate Party member Victor Argonov presented detailed raw files of his electronic opera "2032" under free license CC BY-NC 3.0 (later relicensed under CC BY-SA 4.0). This opera was originally composed and published in 2007 by Russian label MC Entertainment as a commercial product, but then the author changed its status to free. In his blog he said that he decided to open raw files (including WAV, MIDI and other used formats) to the public to support worldwide pirate actions against SOPA and PIPA. Several Internet resources called "2032" the first open-source musical opera in history.

== See also ==
- Free music
- Open-source record label
- International Music Score Library Project
- List of musical works released in a stem format
- Mutopia Project
- Open music model
- Podsafe
- Royalty free music
- Splice (platform)
