= TechPresident =

techPresident
- Website type: Blogging
- Available in: English
- Owner: Andrew Rasiej (Publisher)
- Creators: Andrew Rasiej; Micah L. Sifry (Co-founder)
- Editors: Jessica McKenzie (Managing); Antonella Napolitano (Europe)
- Registration: Optional
- Launched: 2007; 19 years ago
- OCLC number: 753905092

TechPresident was a nonpartisan political website founded by Andrew Rasiej and Micah Sifry with the idea of tracking how the Internet is impacting U.S. political campaigns. It was launched on February 12, 2007 to monitor the United States presidential election of 2008 and was active until 2015. The site followed how the campaigns were utilizing new Internet-based strategies and how citizens were creating content, such as YouTube videos and Facebook groups, using the social media technologies.

TechPresident was an extension of Personal Democracy Forum, an annual conference and online magazine which focused on the broader topic of how technology is changing politics and advocacy.
