= Open Audio License =

Free music license created by the Electronic Frontier Foundation

The Open Audio License is a free music license created in 2001 by the Electronic Frontier Foundation (EFF). It provides freedom and openness of use for music and other expressive works. Publication of the first version of the Open Audio License spurred the creation of the original Open Music Registry to support the license and provide a directory for finding works released under the license.

== Adoption of Creative Commons licensing ==
The EFF now encourages artists to use the Creative Commons Attribution-ShareAlike license instead of the Open Audio License, and it "designates the Creative Commons Attribution Share-Alike license as version 2.0 of the Open Audio License." The Creative Commons licenses express the same principles as the original Open Audio License—a recognition that some creators want to make their works available to the public on less restrictive terms than copyright's defaults, with permission to copy, distribute, adapt, and publicly perform their works.
