= Ashley Maher =

Canadian singer and songwriter

- Born: Montreal, Quebec, Canada
- Origin: Canadian
- Occupation(s): Singer, songwriter
- Website: ashleymaher.com

Ashley Maher is a Canadian singer and songwriter who has meshed the rhythmic impulses of West Africa and Latin America with Western song structures.

== Biography ==
Ashley Maher was born to British parents in Montreal, Quebec, Canada, and moved to Los Angeles at the age of five. Her parents encouraged her singing from an early age, and she tried out many styles, including jazz, choral and medieval music. She even studied opera for a year in Italy.

The turning point was a chance visit to a class in African music at UC Berkeley held by C.K. Ladzekpo, a master drummer from Ghana. An instant convert to West African rhythms, she studied with him for two years before finishing her degree and moving to London.

In London, Maher performed with an Afro-pop band for two years before making her first demo tape, featuring her intricate vocals woven with Ghanaian drumming. The demo soon led to her signing a contract with Virgin Records and Virgin released her first two albums: Hi and Pomegranate. Both received excellent reviews worldwide.

When EMI bought Virgin Records, Maher left the label and went on to independently record a third CD, The Blessed Rain, in Paris and London with West African musicians.

After completing The Blessed Rain, Maher moved back to Los Angeles to continue her career. She has performed extensively and opened for major world music icons like Salif Keita, Baaba Maal, Vusi Mahlasela, Orchestra Baobab, Zap Mama, and Dobet Gnahore. Maher released a fourth CD, Flying Over Bridges, in 2006. Produced by Cameroon's Andre Manga, it features world/jazz musicians from Los Angeles as well a guest appearances by Youssou N'Dour's guitarist Jimi Mbaye and Cameroonian saxophone legend, Manu Dibango, who also co-wrote the song "Club Dibango and the Rising Son".

Maher co-wrote a song called "Boul Bayekou" for Youssou N'Dour's 2006 Senegalese release Alsaama Day and his international CD Rokku Mi Rokka.

In April 2008, N'Dour flew Maher to Dakar, Senegal, to rehearse with his group as a dancer for two weeks. She then performed with Youssou N'Dour and Les Super Etoiles de Dakar for two large shows: first at the Sorano Theater in Dakar and then in front of 15,000 at Paris' Bercy Arena. Since this time, online videos of Maher dancing sabar (a complex dance of Senegal's Wolof people) have been viewed by over half a million people.

Maher spent September 2008 in Dakar, Senegal, recording her fifth CD, Amina, with key members of Youssou N'Dour's band, Les Super Etoiles. She spent 2009 completing the CD (with Andre Manga again producing) and touring England, Scotland, and Spain.

In 2010, Maher returned to Dakar to promote Amina. She opened for Orchestra Baobab, did many interviews for radio, TV, and press, and filmed her second video from the record. Since then, she has divided her time between Dakar and Los Angeles, recording and performing with her all-star Senegalese band, while continuing to perform in the US with her Los Angeles-based musicians. In Senegal, Maher recorded, video-ed, and released two further singles: "On Dit Merci," and "Soon".

== Discography ==
=== Albums ===
- Hi, Virgin Records (CDV 2611), 1990
- Pomegranate, Virgin Records (CDV 2687), 1992
- The Blessed Rain, Spin Wild Records (swcd 001), 1997
- Flying Over Bridges, Spin Wild Records (swcd 03), 2006
- Amina, Spin Wild Records (swcd 004), 2010

=== Singles ===
- "Dreaming re-dreaming" / "Step by Step", Virgin Records (VS 1253), 1990 UK No. 103
- "Step by Step", Virgin Records (VSCDT 1253), 1990 UK No. 121
- "So Many Times", Virgin Records (VSCDT 1287), 1990 UK No. 121
- "Laughter in the Rain", Virgin Records (VSCDT 1385), 1991
- "Stumbling Block", Virgin Records (VSCDT 1409), 1992
- "Try to Hide", Spin Wild Records, 2009
- "Small Boats", Spin Wild Records, 2010
- "On Dit Merci", Spin Wild Records, 2010
- "Soon", Spin Wild Records, 2011
