= Calabash Music =

Online music company

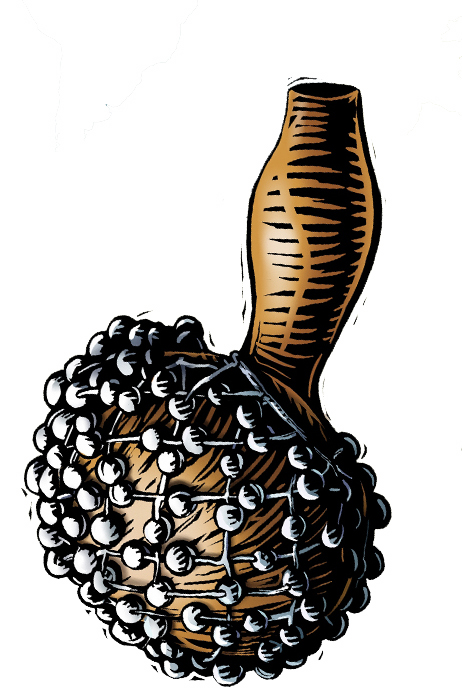
- Founded: 2001
- Founder: Brad Powell
- Defunct: 2012
- Status: Inactive
- Genre: World music
- Country of origin: U.S.
- Location: Somerville, Massachusetts
- Official website: calabashmusic.com

Calabash Music was an online music company based in Somerville, Massachusetts established in 2001 by Brad Powell. In 2008 management of the Calabash Music catalogue was taken over by the French company Mondomix, which ceased operation of the music service in 2012.

== Music ==
Calabash Music used a self-described "equal exchange" revenue share. When Calabash sold music licensed directly from an artist, the artist got 50% of the money from each sale. Artists on Calabash had to manage and pay mechanical rights associated with digital sales. The music in Calabash Music's catalog was primarily licensed from independent artists or small, independent labels.

Calabash's catalogue contained more than 130 genres, and a similar number of regional breakdowns, from continental (Africa, Europe, etc.), to country specific (Mali, France, India, etc.). The genres ranged from the well known (R&B or salsa) to the obscure (morna or son jarocho). Some well known independent artists that Calabash had direct licenses with included Omar Sosa, Thomas Mapfumo, and Ashley Maher.

== Licensing ==
Calabash licensed music directly from artists, from labels, and from aggregators. All licenses were non-exclusive. Some artists that Calabash licensed music from did not have the resources or desire to sign with a record label. Calabash also licensed music via small independent labels, and dealt with labels based all over the world.

== Web logs ==
Calabash also maintained several blogs.

Global Music Videos: The Calabash Global Music Videos blog contains videos from artists around the world. Most videos are from artists that Calabash has a license to sell music for, although a few are not represented on the website.
Global Music News: The Calabash Global Music News Blog contains content on developments in the global world music community.
Free Single Blog: Every week, Calabash offers 10 songs from 10 artists for free promotional download. The Free Single Blog tracks the free songs and gives other information regarding the artist's work.

== Tune Your World campaign ==
Calabash had a campaign entitled 'Tune Your World.' The aim of the campaign was to give aid to Africa through the support of African artists. The campaign worked with artists engaged in their community to create change in the domains of health, community, and peace.

Musicians featured in the campaign included Sierra Leone Refugee All Stars, Afrobeat Sudan Aid Project, Stop Excision Project, Zola, The Mutubambile Orphan Choir.

== Relationship with National Geographic ==
National Geographic partnered up with Calabash Music (as well as the Public Radio International show, Afropop Worldwide, the satellite channel LinkTV, and Global Rhythm magazine) to launch its world music store. The partnership uses Calabash's catalogue to popularize the site worldmusic.NationalGeographic.com

Like the main site of Calabash Music, the National Geographic World Music allowed users to access music by artist, region or genre.

== See also ==
- List of record labels
