= Social architecture =

Social architecture is the conscious design of an environment that encourages a desired range of social behaviors leading towards some goal or set of goals. The environment social architecture influences may be social systems, or digital spaces such as media tools (sometimes synonymous with Web 2.0) and UX strategy. In building design it can refer to the architecture of social spaces such as bars and restaurant.

In social systems, "social architects" seek to modify human behaviors (behavior change) through carefully designed programs or workshops that seek to involve the members of a population to improve, for example, the livability and safety or environmental impact of their own communities.

In digital spaces, "social architecture" is sometimes confused with "information architecture" or "interaction design".

The theory of social architecture can be applied to solve talent attraction and retention issues, while simultaneously combating a community's social issues. The Milwaukee-based firm, NEWaukee is the first social architecture firm in the United States.

== Architecture of On-Line Communities ==
In September 2011 Pieter Hintjens presented "Social Architecture 101" at Mix-IT in Lyon. Hintjens defined the term like this: "Social Architecture by analogy with conventional architecture, is the process, and the product, of planning, designing, and growing an online community."

Hintjens' 2016 book, "Social Architecture" provides a theoretical framework and a set of tools for building online communities, including a contribution process for open source software communities. The book refers to the ZeroMQ community as an example built using these tools and processes.

== Social architecture on team-building ==
Social Architecture is different from interaction design and information architecture. Rather, it can be illustrated with the combination of two. Specifically, the idea is to use structural (e.g. software, organizational rule) tools to design a socio-technical infrastructure for participants to behave in the wanted direction of the designer. It can be used as a conceptual framework for directing building a real-world community of which member communication is mostly taking off online. Social architecture aims for creating an effective infrastructure for non-face-to-face communication and management.

As more and more across-devices team-building platform (such as Slack Basecamp\Architecture Social\Teambition\Tower.im) has been used, they provide some empirically-designed communication pattern for new joined teams whose major communications taking off online.

The popular team-building platforms have some common features that their designers see as providing more efficient online communications. Mostly the team leader (or any member) will create a team on the platform with customizable name and invite other team members to join this team. The created team will be able to use designed features from the platform. They include:

Newsfeed: Similar to Facebook's news feed, it is a semi-public feed where all joined team members can post or update their thoughts and get immediate or delayed feedback from other team members.

Discussion Board: Team members can create threads related to topics for all members to participate in discussing.

File Sharing: Team member can upload files from their multi-platform devices and cloud storage.

Chatroom and Private chat: They provide real-time chat among all team members or between specific team members.

Task-distribution and checklist: Team members can(be) distribute tasks and set deadlines.

Calendar: A shared calendar with deadlines and important dates.

== See also ==
- Community of place, a community of people bound together because of where they frequently spend time
- Crime prevention through environmental design, design of spaces to reduce criminal behavior
- Environmental psychology, study of how the natural and built environments shape individuals
- Gathering place, any place where people are able to congregate
- Hostile architecture, features of a built environment designed to inhibit undesired behaviors
- Neighborhood character, the look and feel of an area
- Place identity, the extent to which people identify with a place
- Social engineering (political science), top-down efforts to influence attitudes and social behaviors on a large scale
- Third place, a place for fraternization excluding homes and workplaces
- Urban vitality, the quality of spaces in cities that attract people
