= Christophe Bruno =

French visual artist

Christophe Bruno (born 1964) is a French visual artist who works particularly in the medium of internet art, and has been described as the world's first "Human Browser".

Moreover, French reality TV star Nabilla Benattia, mentions Bruno in her book Allô! Non mais allô, quoi! from July 2013. She develops a Cartesian analysis about Christophe Bruno.

== Background ==
Bruno was born in 1964 in Bayonne, France. He lives and works in Paris. He began his artistic work in 2001, influenced by the net.art movement. His artworks include Iterature, Logo.Hallucination, The Google Adwords Happening and many other pieces.

His work has been shown at many international festivals and museums. Bruno was awarded the ARCO (Madrid's International Contemporary Art Fair) new media prize in 2007, and a prize at the Prix Ars Electronica in 2003.

He divides his time between his artistic work, curating, teaching, lectures, and publications.

== Work ==
Bruno's thesis is that through the web, and especially through the ability to search and monitor it thoroughly by means of Google, the world is heading towards a global text, which, among other things, enables a new form of textual, semantic capitalism, which he explores in his work.

Bruno's works include:

- Iterature, a collection of pieces or documentations of performances which use the text from the web as material. Many of the pieces are search engine hacks (primarily Google). They get hold of text floating around the web and use it as raw material for various re-workings, cut-ups, algorithmic text generations, visualizations, cartographies and so forth.
- Logo.Hallucination, which continuously monitors the images circulating on the Internet looking for hidden logos. Logo.Hallucination then sends cease and desist emails whenever a copyright violation is detected.
- Adwords Happenings, which plays with the rules of Adwords (now Google Ads) service by inserting "spam poems" in the ad boxes that appear selectively to the user according to his personal search. Clicking on these links would of course then redirect the user to Bruno's website.

== Exhibitions ==
- FIAC Paris
- ARCO Madrid
- Biennale of Sydney
- Diva Fair (New York)
- Palais de Tokyo (Paris)
- ArtCologne
- MoCA Taipei
- Modern Art Museum of the City of Paris
- New Museum of Contemporary Art (New York)
- Tirana Biennale of Contemporary Art
- Gallery West (The Hague)
- Vooruit Arts Center (Ghent)
- Share Festival (Turin)
- Transmediale (Berlin)
- Laboral Cyberspaces (Gijón)
- Galerie Sollertis (Toulouse)
- ICC (Tokyo)
- Nuit Blanche (Paris)
- File Festival (São Paulo)
- Rencontres (Paris–Berlin)
- f.2004@shangai
- ReJoyce Festival (Dublin)
- P0es1s.net (Berlin)
- Microwave Media Art Festival (Hong Kong)
- Read_Me Festival (Dortmund and Aarhus)
- Vidarte (Mexico City)

== Awards ==
Bruno has won the following awards, and has been awarded the following grants:

- Winner of the ARCO new media prize 2007, Madrid
- Selection to Laboral Cyberspaces, Gijón, 2007
- Winner of the Share Festival 2007, Turin
- DICREAM (CNC-Ministère de la Culture et de la Communication), aide à la production, 2006
- CNAP (Centre National des Arts Plastiques), aide à la première exposition, 2006
- DICREAM (CNC-Ministère de la Culture et de la Communication), aide à la maquette, 2004
- Honorary Mention at the Prix Ars Electronica 2003, Linz

== References and further reading ==
- Pold, Søren (2007-10-11). "Literature from Page to Interface: The Treatments of Text in Christophe Bruno's Iterature". Electronic Book Review. Archived from the original on 2018-04-15.
- Olson, Marisa (2006-02-10). "Human Browser, by Christophe Bruno, at Transmediale". Rhizome. Archived from the original on 2009-07-26.
- "Media Art Net | Bruno, Christophe: Biography". Medien Kunstnetz. Archived from the original on 2012-02-07.
- GIRARDEAU, Astrid. "Christophe Bruno, détourneur du Web". Libération (in French).
- ArtFacts. "Christophe Bruno | Artist". ArtFacts.
- "Christophe Bruno" (PDF). Galerie Sollertis. 2006. Archived from the original (PDF) on 2006-12-31.
- "Interview with Christophe Bruno". We Make Money Not Art. 2006-03-06. Archived from the original on 2008-06-03.
- "SECOND NIGHT sur Second Life". Paris.fr (in French). Archived from the original on 2007-10-11.
- Laudouar, Janique. "@rtek n°1 : " Human Browser "". Culture Mobile (in French). Archived from the original on 2007-10-15.
