= Opsound =

Logo

Opsound was a website which aggregated links to music released under Creative Commons licenses. Opsound aggregated links to music hosted on other servers, as well as provided discussion forums and organized real-world events and concerts. It published one CD by the artist Catalpa Catalpa entitled "Hardoncity."

Opsound was a social art project by Sal Randolph, who created the site to provide a space for open, uncurated collaboration between musicians and sound artists. It was described on the site as "a gift economy in action, an experiment in applying the model of free software to music."

Lawrence Lessig often mentioned Opsound when discussing Creative Commons, citing its structure and licensing as a positive aid to enhanced collaboration and communication between artists.

Opsound did not host works, leaving that to others, such as the Internet Archive's Netlabels collection. Metadata included descriptions of songs and artists, track numbers, and indexed keywords associated with songs. All songs were available under the Creative Commons Attribution-ShareAlike license (typically version 2.5, but sometimes only older versions of the license). Some songs were licensed under the more liberal Attribution license. Popularity charts were added around the end of 2003 and the beginning of 2004. A redesign of the site was implemented towards the end of 2005. Some popular artists included _aa_, Binary Beats, and the Evolution Control Committee. There were plans to add software for so-called "microlabels" to allow people to create their own albums from the sound pool.
