= Jamendo =

Website and weblabel

Jamendo S.A.
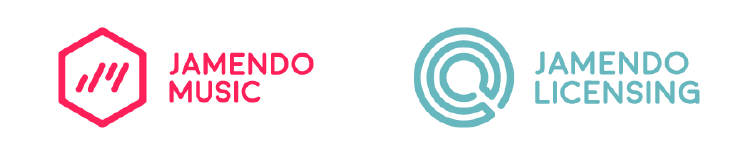
- Type: Private
- Industry: Music
- Founded: 1 December 2004; 21 years ago
- Founder: Pierre Gérard; Laurent Kratz; Sylvain Zimmer
- Headquarters: Luxembourg, Luxembourg
- Area served: Worldwide
- Key people: Alexandre Saboundjian (CEO); Jocelyn Seilles (General Manager)
- Products: Jamendo Music; Jamendo Licensing
- Services: Free music, music licensing
- Parent: Winamp Group
- Website: jamendo.com licensing.jamendo.com

Jamendo is a Luxembourg-based music website and an open community of independent artists and music lovers. A subsidiary of Belgian company Winamp Group, and Independent Management Entity (IME) since 2019.

Originally, Jamendo was a music platform under Creative Commons licenses. As of October 2015, Jamendo no longer presents itself as such but rather as a free streaming service for personal use. The stated purpose of Jamendo is to bring together musicians and music lovers, while providing opportunities for artists to become better known and earn money through its licensing services.

The name "Jamendo" is a portmanteau derived from a fusion of two musical terms: "jam session" and "crescendo".

At the heart of Jamendo lies an economic model that provides free music download and streaming for Internet users, while allowing artists to sell commercial licenses of their music for commercial use, such as music synchronization for audiovisual creations or background music in a public space through Jamendo Licensing.

Based in Luxembourg, Jamendo had a community of 3 million users in 2017.

In late 2013, the catalog contained 400,000 titles, shared by over 30,000 artists from more than 150 countries.

In May 2015, the homepage of the site indicated a total of 460,000 titles and 250 million downloads since launch.

In December 2016, 40,000 artists from more than 150 countries were part of Jamendo, sharing more than half a million songs to be streamed and/or downloaded for free.

== History ==
Jamendo’s former logo (2007–2012)

Jamendo S.A., originally created under the name Peermajor SARL in 2004, was launched in January 2005. It was funded in June 2007 by Mangrove Capital Partners, Skype's investors. Starting in January 2007, Jamendo tested an advertising revenue sharing program which was later dropped. In December 2007, the second version of the website was launched, offering a new design and new functionalities. On 18 June 2008 the platform passed the 10,000 albums milestone.

At the end of 2008, Jamendo launched Jamendo PRO, a music licensing platform for commercial use, making Jamendo music available for the synchronization of audiovisual projects (film, TV, advertising, web and corporate videos, video games, apps, etc.) and as background music in public places (stores, restaurants, hotels, etc.).

June 2009 saw the release of Jamendo's first mobile applications for Android and iOS. That same month, Jamendo's co-founder and CTO Sylvain Zimmer received the Young Entrepreneur of the Year award in Luxembourg. In December 2009, a partnership was made with Deezer, giving Jamendo artists the opportunity to release their music on Deezer as well.

Jamendo faced financial difficulties in early 2010 and started looking for investors. Stability returned when MusicMatic (now Storever), a Brussels-based company specialized in music solutions for businesses and public places, entered Jamendo's capital.

In August 2011, Jamendo obtained the "PUR" label from the French authority HADOPI, which was renewed the following year.

On 24 April 2012, the third version of the website was launched. It offered a new design, new functionalities allowing for more artist promotion, ten new genre-specific radio channels, etc.

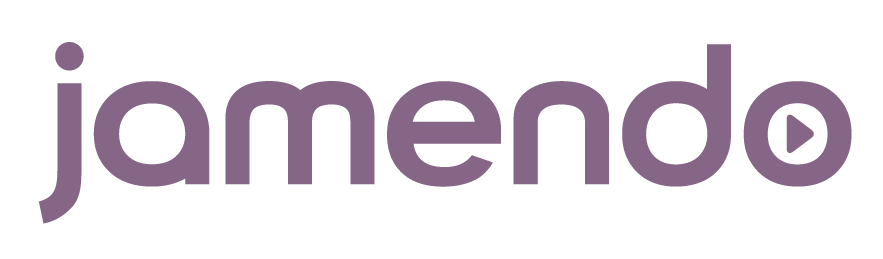
Jamendo’s former logo (2012–2015)

On 8 December 2014, Jamendo PRO turned into Jamendo Licensing, showing an entirely reshaped version of their commercial service.

As of October 2015, Jamendo officially became Jamendo Music, showing its willingness to clearly differentiate the two parts of the company (Jamendo Music and Jamendo Licensing). Jamendo Music intends to provide music for private use only, and Jamendo Licensing is a marketplace where anyone can sell and buy music, whether it is for a multimedia project (television, movie, advertising, video production) or as background music for commercial space.

By 2018, Jamendo was a subsidiary of Belgian company AudioValley.

In February 2019 Jamendo has adopted the Independent Management Entity (IME) status. Created by the Directive 2014/26/EU transposed in Luxembourg Law in April 2018, the IME legal status allows commercial entities to perform activities similar to national copyright and related rights Collective Management Organizations such as, for copyright, SACEM, SGAE, GEMA and SIAE.

== Sharing music for free ==
Jamendo offers artists the opportunity to publish their music for free under Creative Commons licenses (and also the Free Art License in the past). In order to avoid contractual litigation, artists joining Jamendo cannot be registered to any collecting rights society, such as GEMA in Germany, SGAE in Spain, or SACEM in France. More flexibility is observed in other collecting societies, recognizing music under Creative Commons licenses as long as commercial use is excluded. This is notably the case for SACEM in France. In the United States, ASCAP and BMI recognize the use of Jamendo by their registered artists.

Each artist has a profile displaying uploaded albums and singles, along with artist information. These profiles are managed by the artist, with access to various features and tools like stats, notifications about interaction with the music, fan messaging, etc.

== Website ==
Users can listen to MP3-encoded audio files (96 kbit/s) and download in MP3 (192 kbit/s) and Ogg Vorbis formats. Listening and downloading is free, unlimited and without any advertisements. The site is available in eight languages: English, French, Spanish, German, Italian, Polish, Russian, and Portuguese.

Each user has a personal account in which extended features are available, for example, creating playlists, saving their favorite songs and albums, becoming a fan of an artist, sharing on social networks, reviewing tracks or albums, and following their favorite artists. The website also promotes new music through an editorial feed on the homepage, along with top charts and genre-specific radio channels. A search engine allows users to look for specific artists or titles, but also search by tags, which are chosen by artists to describe their songs (genre, instrument, mood, theme, etc.).

Jamendo is integrated within media players like VLC media player, Cantata, Songbird, Clementine and Amarok 2. It was integrated into Rhythmbox from version 0.9.6 until 2.9x, then removed for technical reasons, but the library can be accessed from Rhythmbox's Grilo plugin. Jamendo is not integrated into Banshee by default, but can be integrated with a plugin.

== Business model ==
According to one article on Jamendo's business model, Jamendo's use of voluntary donations represents the first serious attempt for a file sharing site to provide a direct way to pay artists. In 2007, Jamendo provided an advertising revenue sharing model for artists.

In 2016, Jamendo generated $1 million for independent artists, and passed up to 65% of revenue to the rights-holders.

Jamendo works with Storever (formerly MusicMatic) to offer music solutions for chainstores and public places.

== Jamendo Licensing ==
The Jamendo Licensing service is an intermediary between artists and third parties who wish to use the music in their projects. Based on the CC Plus concept, the licenses are granted mainly for the uses not covered by Creative Commons licenses. Jamendo’s artists are free to opt in and out of the service, which grants them an up to 65% share of all income generated by their licenses sold on the platform. This share is determined by several factors, such as the type of contract, the amount of sales, and so on.

Jamendo Licensing answers different needs in music licensing: Catalog offers low-priced music licenses for synchronization in audiovisual projects (advertising, film, television, video games, mobile applications, YouTube videos, etc.), while In-Store offers background music solutions for commercial spaces (stores, shops, hotels, restaurants, etc.).
