= Open music model =

Framework for the recording industry

The open music model is an economic and technological framework for the recording industry based on research conducted at the Massachusetts Institute of Technology. It predicts that the playback of prerecorded music will be regarded as a service rather than as individually sold products, and that the only system for the digital distribution of music that will be viable against piracy is a subscription-based system supporting file sharing and free of digital rights management. The research also indicated that US$9 per month for unlimited use would be the market clearing price at that time, but recommended $5 per month as the long-term optimal price.

Since its creation in 2002, a number of its principles have been adopted throughout the recording industry, and it has been cited as the basis for the business model of many music subscription services.

== Overview ==
The model asserts that there are five necessary requirements for a viable commercial music digital distribution network:

#	Requirement	Description
1	Open file sharing	users must be free to share files with each other
2	Open file formats	content must be distributed in open formats with no DRM restrictions
3	Open membership	copyright holders must be able to freely register to receive payment
4	Open payment	payment should be accepted via multiple means, not a closed system
5	Open competition	multiple such systems must exist which can interoperate, not a designed monopoly

The model was proposed by Shuman Ghosemajumder in his 2002 research paper Advanced Peer-Based Technology Business Models at the MIT Sloan School of Management. It was the first of several studies that found significant demand for online, open music sharing systems. The following year, it was publicly referred to as the Open Music Model.

The model suggests changing the way consumers interact with the digital property market: rather than being seen as a good to be purchased from online vendors, music would be treated as a service being provided by the industry, with firms based on the model serving as intermediaries between the music industry and its consumers. The model proposed giving consumers unlimited access to music for the price of $5 per month ($9 in 2025), based on research showing that this could be a long-term optimal price, expected to bring in a total revenue of over US$3 billion per year.

The research demonstrated the demand for third-party file sharing programs. Insofar as the interest for a particular piece of digital property is high, and the risk of acquiring the good via illegitimate means is low, people will naturally flock towards third-party services such as Napster and Morpheus (more recently, Bittorrent and The Pirate Bay).

The research showed that consumers would use file sharing services not primarily due to cost but because of convenience, indicating that services which provided access to the most music would be the most successful.

== Industry adoption ==
The model predicted the failure of online music distribution systems based on digital rights management.

Criticisms of the model included that it would not eliminate the issue of piracy. Others countered that it was in fact the most viable solution to piracy, since piracy was "inevitable". Supporters argued that it offered a superior alternative to the current law-enforcement based methods used by the recording industry. One startup in Germany, Playment, announced plans to adapt the entire model to a commercial setting as the basis for its business model.

Several aspects of the model have been adopted by the recording industry and its partners over time:

Why would the big four music companies agree to let Apple and others distribute their music without using DRM systems to protect it? The simplest answer is because DRMs haven't worked, and may never work, to halt music piracy.

— Steve Jobs, Thoughts on Music open letter, 2007
- The abolition of digital rights management represented a major shift for the industry. In 2007, Steve Jobs, CEO of Apple, published a letter calling for an end to DRM in music. A few months later, Amazon.com launched a store single individual DRM-free mp3's. One year later, iTunes Store abolished DRM on most of its individual tracks.
- Open payment was relatively straightforward to implement, and the iTunes Store offered gift cards, which could be purchased with cash, from its launch in 2003.
- In 2010, Rhapsody announced a download ability for their subscribers using iPhones.
- In 2011, Apple launched its iTunes Match service with a subscription model, supporting file-sharing between a user's own devices. However, the subscription price did not include the cost of acquiring content, which would still have to be purchased on a per track basis from the iTunes Store.
- Pricing close to the model's suggested $5 per month price, or its $9 per month market clearing price, has been adopted by many platforms:
  - In 2005, Yahoo! Music was launched at $5 per month with digital rights management.
  - In 2011, Spotify introduced a $5 per month premium subscription in the United States with digital rights management, recognized as adhering closely to the model.
  - In 2011, Microsoft Zune offered a subscription service for music downloads with digital rights management known as a Zune Pass, at $10 a month.
  - in 2012, Google Play Music launched unlimited music streaming for a subscription price of $9.99 per month. Users can upload their own MP3s to the service and download them, but cannot download songs they have not uploaded themselves.
  - In 2014, Amazon added DRM music streaming to their Amazon Prime service.
  - In 2015, Apple announced Apple Music, which would offer unlimited streaming of songs encrypted with FairPlay DRM for a subscription price of $9.99 per month, and compensate artists on the basis of song popularity. Apple reportedly wanted to enter the market with a lower price but was pressured by record labels to adopt a higher subscription fee.
- According to inflation calculated through the United States Consumer Price Index calculator, the $9 per month estimated market-clearing price in 2002 would become US$13.72 per month in 2021, closer to Apple Music's family plan price of $14.99.

== See also ==
- Comparison of online music stores
- Comparison of on-demand streaming music services
- Disk sharing
- Fan-funded music
- File sharing
- File sharing timeline
- File-sharing program
- Peer-to-peer
- Record industry
- Subscription business model
- Threshold pledge system
