= Agricultural Policy Environmental eXtender =

American environmental simulation model

Agricultural Policy Environmental eXtender (Note: Also stylized as Agricultural Policy/Environmental eXtender.) (APEX) is a biophysically, continuous simulation model developed in the late 1990s as an extension of the EPIC (Erosion Productivity Impact Calculator) model. EPIC was originally created in 1981 to assess the impacts of soil erosion on agricultural productivity across diverse soil, climate, and cropping systems in the United States. Over time, EPIC evolved to simulate hydrology, nutrient cycling, pesticide fate, carbon dynamics, and climate change impacts.

APEX extends EPIC from a field-scale model to whole-farm and small watershed applications. It was developed to evaluate environmental and management issues associated with crop and livestock production systems, including manure management, water quality, and conservation practices. The model operates on a daily time step and simulates surface runoff, sediment transport, wind and water erosion, nutrient losses (nitrogen and phosphorus), soil carbon dynamics, crop growth, grazing systems, and routing of water, sediment, nutrients, and pesticides across complex landscapes and channel networks.

APEX has been widely applied in environmental assessments at field, watershed, regional, and national scales. The model was originally developed through collaborative efforts involving the United States Department of Agriculture (USDA) and research institutions, and the current supported version (APEX1501) is maintained by Texas A&M AgriLife Research in collaboration with USDA-NRCS.

== See also ==
- Soil and Water Assessment Tool
- WEPP
- CropSyst
- DSSAT
- Crop simulation model
- Universal Soil Loss Equation
