= Group decision-making =

Subset of decision science

Group decision-making (also known as collaborative decision-making or collective decision-making) is a situation faced when individuals collectively make a choice from the alternatives before them. The decision is then no longer attributable to any single individual who is a member of the group. This is because all the individuals and social group processes such as social influence contribute to the outcome. The decisions made by groups are often different from those made by individuals. In workplace settings, collaborative decision-making is one of the most successful models to generate buy-in from other stakeholders, build consensus, and encourage creativity. According to the idea of synergy, decisions made collectively also tend to be more effective than decisions made by a single individual. In this vein, certain collaborative arrangements have the potential to generate better net performance outcomes than individuals acting on their own. Under normal everyday conditions, collaborative or group decision-making would often be preferred and would generate more benefits than individual decision-making when there is the time for proper deliberation, discussion, and dialogue. This can be achieved through the use of committee, teams, groups, partnerships, or other collaborative social processes.

However, in some cases, there can also be drawbacks to this method. In extreme emergencies or crisis situations, other forms of decision-making might be preferable as emergency actions may need to be taken more quickly with less time for deliberation. On the other hand, additional considerations must also be taken into account when evaluating the appropriateness of a decision-making framework. For example, the possibility of group polarization also can occur at times, leading some groups to make more extreme decisions than those of its individual members, in the direction of the individual inclinations. There are also other examples where the decisions made by a group are flawed, such as the Bay of Pigs invasion, the incident on which the groupthink model of group decision-making is based.

Factors that impact other social group behaviours also affect group decisions. For example, groups high in cohesion, in combination with other antecedent conditions (e.g. ideological homogeneity and insulation from dissenting opinions) have been noted to have a negative effect on group decision-making and hence on group effectiveness. Moreover, when individuals make decisions as part of a group, there is a tendency to exhibit a bias towards discussing shared information (i.e. shared information bias), as opposed to unshared information.

== In psychology ==
The social identity approach suggests a more general approach to group decision-making than the popular groupthink model, which is a narrow look at situations where group and other decision-making is flawed. Social identity analysis suggests that the changes which occur during collective decision-making are part of rational psychological processes which build on the essence of the group in ways that are psychologically efficient, grounded in the social reality experienced by members of the group, and have the potential to have a positive impact on society.

== Formal systems ==
Consensus decision-making
Tries to avoid "winners" and "losers". Consensus requires that a majority approve a given course of action, but that the minority agree to go along with the course of action. In other words, if the minority opposes the course of action, consensus requires that the course of action be modified to remove objectionable features.

Voting-based methods
Range voting lets each member score one or more of the available options. The option with the highest average is chosen. This method has experimentally been shown to produce the lowest Bayesian regret among common voting methods, even when voters are strategic.
Majority requires support from more than 50% of the members of the group. Thus, the bar for action is lower than with unanimity and a group of "losers" is implicit to this rule.
Plurality, where the largest block in a group decides, even if it falls short of a majority.

Delphi method
Delphi method is a process of collective anonymous thought exchange using the form of correspondence. It has three characteristics that are clearly different from other expert prediction methods, namely anonymity, multiple feedback, and statistical responses of groups. Named after the Oracle of Delphi, it was developed in the 1950s by the American RAND Corporation, established by the Douglas Aircraft Company, as an effective and reliable method of collecting expert opinions and was widely used in commercial, military, educational, health care and other fields.

Three characteristics of Delphi method:

(i) Anonymity

Since all members of the Group do not meet directly when this approach is used, they communicate by mail, thus eliminating the impact of the authority. This is the main feature of the method. Anonymity is a very important function of Delphi methods. Forecasters don't know each other. They exchanged ideas with complete anonymity.

(ii) Feedback

This method requires 3 to 4 rounds of information feedback. In the hourly feedback, both the investigation team and the expert team can conduct in-depth research, so the final results can basically reflect the basic ideas of the experts and the understanding of the information. Therefore, the results are expensive and objective. Credible. Communication between team members is achieved by answering the organizer's questions, usually requiring multiple rounds of feedback to complete the prediction.

(iii) Statistics

The most typical group prediction results reflect the views of the majority of people, and at most only the views of a few people are mentioned, but this does not indicate the state of the different views of the group. Each view is included in such statistical information, avoiding the shortcoming that the expert meeting methodology reflects only the majority view.

Dotmocracy
A method that relies on the use of forms called "dotmocracy sheets" to allow large groups to brainstorm collectively and recognize agreement on an unlimited number of ideas they have authored.

== Decision-making in social settings ==
Decision-making in groups is sometimes examined separately as process and outcome. Process refers to the group interactions. Some relevant ideas include coalitions among participants as well as influence and persuasion. The use of politics is often judged negatively, but it is a useful way to approach problems when preferences among actors are in conflict, when dependencies exist that cannot be avoided, when there are no super-ordinate authorities, and when the technical or scientific merit of the options is ambiguous.

In addition to the different processes involved in making decisions, group decision support systems (GDSSs) may have different decision rules. A decision rule is the GDSS protocol a group uses to choose among scenario planning alternatives.

Gathering
Involves all participants acknowledging each other's needs and opinions and tends towards a problem solving approach in which as many needs and opinions as possible can be satisfied. It allows for multiple outcomes and does not require agreement from some for others to act.
Sub-committee
Involves assigning responsibility for evaluation of a decision to a sub-set of a larger group, which then comes back to the larger group with recommendations for action. Using a sub-committee is more common in larger governance groups, such as a legislature. Sometimes a sub-committee includes those individuals most affected by a decision, although at other times it is useful for the larger group to have a sub-committee that involves more neutral participants.
Participatory
Each participant has a say that is directly proportional to the degree that particular decision would affect the individual. Those not affected by a decision would have no say and those exclusively affected by a decision would have full say. Likewise, those most affected would have the most say while those least affected would have the least say.

Plurality and dictatorship are less desirable as decision rules because they do not require the involvement of the broader group to determine a choice. Thus, they do not engender commitment to the course of action chosen. An absence of commitment from individuals in the group can be problematic during the implementation phase of a decision.

There are no perfect decision-making rules. Depending on how the rules are implemented in practice and the situation, all of these can lead to situations where either no decision is made, or to situations where decisions made are inconsistent with one another over time.

=== Social decision schemes ===
Sometimes, groups may have established and clearly defined standards for making decisions, such as bylaws and statutes. However, it is often the case that the decision-making process is less formal, and might even be implicitly accepted. Social decision schemes are the methods used by a group to combine individual responses to come up with a single group decision. There are a number of these schemes, but the following are the most common:

Delegation
An individual, subgroup or external party makes the decision on behalf of the group. For instance, in an "authority scheme", the leader makes the decision or, in an oligarchy, a coalition of leading figures makes the decision.
Averaging
Each group member makes their own private and independent decision and all are later "averaged" to produce a decision.
Elections
Group members vote on their preferences, either privately or publicly. These votes are then used to select a decision, either by plurality, simple majority, supermajority or other more or less complicated criterion.
Unanimity
A consensus scheme whereby the group discusses the issue until it reaches a unanimous agreement. This decision rule is what dictates the decision-making for most juries.
Random
The group leaves the choice to chance. For example, picking a number between 1 and 10 or flipping a coin.

There are strengths and weaknesses to each of these social decision schemes. Delegation saves time and is a good method for less important decisions, but ignored members might react negatively. Averaging responses will cancel out extreme opinions, but the final decision might disappoint many members. Plurality is the most consistent scheme when superior decisions are being made, and it involves the least amount of effort. Voting, however, may lead to members feeling alienated when they lose a close vote, especially if the winner has less than half the votes, or to internal politics, or to conformity to other opinions. Consensus schemes involve members more deeply, and tend to lead to high levels of commitment. But, it might be difficult for the group to reach such decisions.

=== Normative model of decision-making ===
Groups have many advantages and disadvantages when making decisions. Groups, by definition, are composed of two or more people, and for this reason naturally have access to more information and have a greater capacity to process this information. However, they also present a number of liabilities to decision-making, such as requiring more time to make choices and by consequence rushing to a low-quality agreement in order to be timely. Some issues are also so simple that a group decision-making process leads to too many cooks in the kitchen: for such trivial issues, having a group make the decision is overkill and can lead to failure. Because groups offer both advantages and disadvantages in making decisions, Victor Vroom developed a normative model of decision-making that suggests different decision-making methods should be selected depending on the situation. In this model, Vroom identified five different decision-making processes.

Decide
The leader of the group uses other group members as sources of information, but makes the final decision independently and does not explain to group members why s/he required that information.
Consult (individual)
The leader talks to each group member alone and never consults a group meeting. S/he then makes the final decision in light of the information obtained in this manner.
Consult (group)
The group and the leader meet and s/he consults the entire group at once, asking for opinions and information, then comes to a decision.
Facilitate
The leader takes on a cooperative holistic approach, collaborating with the group as a whole as they work toward a unified and consensual decision. The leader is non-directive and never imposes a particular solution on the group. In this case, the final decision is one made by the group, not by the leader.
Delegate
The leader takes a backseat approach, passing the problem over to the group. The leader is supportive, but allows the group to come to a decision without their direct collaboration.

== Decision support systems ==
The idea of using computerized support systems is discussed by James Reason under the heading of intelligent decision support systems in his work on the topic of human error. James Reason notes that events subsequent to The Three Mile accident have not inspired great confidence in the efficacy of some of these methods. In the Davis-Besse accident, for example, both independent safety parameter display systems were out of action before and during the event.

Decision-making software is essential for autonomous robots and for different forms of active decision support for industrial operators, designers and managers.

Due to the large number of considerations involved in many decisions, computer-based decision support systems (DSS) have been developed to assist decision-makers in considering the implications of various courses of thinking. They can help reduce the risk of human errors. DSSs which try to realize some human-cognitive decision-making functions are called Intelligent Decision Support Systems (IDSS). On the other hand, an active and intelligent DSS is an important tool for the design of complex engineering systems and the management of large technological and business projects.

== Influencing factors ==
With age, cognitive function decreases and decision-making ability decreases. Generally speaking, the low age group uses the team decision effect to be good; with the age, the gap between the team decision and the excellent choice increases.

Past experience can influence future decisions. It can be concluded that when a decision produces positive results, people are more likely to make decisions in similar ways in similar situations. On the other hand, people tend to avoid repeating the same mistakes, because future decisions based on past experience are not necessarily the best decisions.

Cognitive bias is a phenomenon in which people often distort their perceived results due to their own or situational reasons when they perceive themselves, others or the external environment. in the decision-making process, cognitive bias influences people by making them over-dependent or giving more trust to expected observations and prior knowledge, while discarding information or observations that are considered uncertain, rather than focusing on more factors. The prospects are broad.

== Group discussion pitfalls ==
Groups have greater informational and motivational resources, and therefore have the potential to outperform individuals. However they do not always reach this potential. Groups often lack proper communication skills. On the sender side this means that group members may lack the skills needed to express themselves clearly. On the receiver side this means that miscommunication can result from information processing limitations and faulty listening habits of human beings. In cases where an individual controls the group it may prevent others from contributing meaningfully.

It is also the case that groups sometimes use discussion to avoid rather than make a decision. Avoidance tactics include the following:

Procrastination
Replacing high-priority tasks with tasks of lower priority. The group postpones the decision rather than studying the alternatives and discussing their relative merits.
Bolstering
The group may quickly or arbitrarily formulate a decision without thinking things through to completion. They then bolster their decision by exaggerating the favorable consequences of the decision and minimizing the importance of unfavorable consequences.
Denying responsibility
The group delegates the decision to a subcommittee or diffuses accountability throughout the entire group, thereby avoiding responsibility.
Muddling through
The group muddles through the issue by considering only a very narrow range of alternatives that differ to only a small degree from the existing choice.
"Satisficing"
A combination of the words "satisfy" and "suffice". Members accept a low-risk, easy solution instead of searching for the best solution.
Trivialization
The group will avoid dealing with larger issues by focusing on minor issues.

Two fundamental "laws" that groups all too often obey:

Parkinson's Law
"A task will expand to fill the time available for its completion."
Law of triviality
"The amount of time a group spends discussing an issue will be in inverse proportion to the consequentiality of the issue."
(For example, a committee discusses an expenditure of $20 million for 3 minutes and one for $500 for 15 minutes.)

=== Failure to share information ===
Research using the hidden profiles task shows that lack of information sharing is a common problem in group decision making. This happens when certain members of the group have information that is not known by all of the members in the group. If the members were to all combine all of their information, they would be more likely to make an optimal decision. But if people do not share all of their information, the group may make a sub-optimal decision. Stasser and Titus have shown that partial sharing of information can lead to a wrong decision. And Lu and Yuan found that groups were eight times more likely to correctly answer a problem when all of the group members had all of the information rather than when some information was only known by select group members.

== Cognitive limitations and subsequent error ==
Individuals in a group decision-making setting are often functioning under substantial cognitive demands. As a result, cognitive and motivational biases can often affect group decision-making adversely. According to Forsyth, there are three categories of potential biases that a group can fall victim to when engaging in decision-making:

=== "Sins of commission" ===
The misuse, abuse and/or inappropriate use of information, including:

Belief perseverance
A group utilises information in their decision-making that has already been deemed inaccurate.
Sunk cost bias
A group remains committed to a given plan primarily due to the investment already made in that plan, regardless of how inefficient and/or ineffective it may have become.
Extra-evidentiary bias
A group choosing to use some information despite having been told it should be ignored.
Hindsight bias
Group members falsely over-estimate the accuracy of and/or the relevance of their past knowledge of a given outcome.

=== "Sins of omission" ===
Overlooking useful information. This can include:

Base rate bias
Group members ignore applicable information they have concerning basic trends/tendencies.
Fundamental attribution error
Group members base their decisions on inaccurate appraisals of individuals' behavior—namely, overestimating internal factors (e.g., personality) and underestimating external or contextual factors. (Note: This phenomenon is reliably observed in individualist cultures, not in collectivist cultures.)

=== "Sins of imprecision" ===
Relying too heavily on heuristics that over-simplify complex decisions. This can include:

Availability heuristic
Group members rely on information that is readily available.
Conjunctive bias
When groups are not aware that the probability of a given event occurring is the least upper bound on the probability of that event and any other given event occurring together; thus if the probability of the second event is less than one, the occurrence of the pair will always be less likely than the first event alone.
Representativeness heuristic
Group members rely too heavily on decision-making factors that seem meaningful but are, in fact, more or less misleading.

== See also ==
- Collective intelligence
- Social choice theory
- Judge–advisor system
- Shared information bias
- Shared intentionality
- Think tanks
- Computer supported brainstorming
- Collaborative decision-making software
- Collective problem solving
- Hindsight bias
- Online participation
- Public participation
- Deliberation
- Low-information rationality
- Open assessment
- Multi-agent systems
- Framework for Accountable Decision-Making
