= Real assets =

Investment asset class: physical assets

Real assets is an investment asset class that covers investments in physical assets such as real estate, energy, and infrastructure. Real assets have an inherent physical worth. Real assets differ from financial assets in that financial assets get their value from a contractual right and are typically intangible.

Real assets are categorized into three categories:

- Real Estate: REITs, commercial real estate, and residential
- Natural Resources: Energy, Oil & gas, MLPs, timber, agriculture, solar, mining, and commodities
- Infrastructure: Transportation (roads, airports, railroads), utilities, telecommunications infrastructure

Real assets are appealing to investors for four reasons: high current income, inflation protection / equity appreciation, low correlation to equity markets, and favorable tax treatment.

== Background ==
Investing in real assets has existed since the advent of property ownership. However, public investment only began in 1965, when the first publicly traded REIT (Continental Mortgage Investors) became listed on the NYSE. This REIT structure has become the dominant legal structure to invest in real estate. The first publicly traded MLP occurred 16 years later, when Apache Petroleum Company listed. The MLP structure has become popular for energy and infrastructure. Combined, these two legal structures been critical to the expansion of real assets as a viable asset class because they are pass-through tax structures, unlike a traditional publicly traded C-corp. However, the trade-off is that at least 90% of the income must be distributed to investors (which is attractive for investors but means that the company has limited ability to retain earnings for growth). That being said, there are some real asset companies structured as C-corps. Moreover, after the 2017 Tax Cuts and Jobs Act, some MLPs and REITs are revisiting their structure.

Today, real assets are a massive publicly traded asset class.

- There are 71 publicly traded MLPs representing almost $300B in equity
- There are 219 publicly traded REITs representing over $1.3T in equity

Additionally, there are multiple much smaller sectors that fall in real assets

- Renewable energy is estimated to have a market size of slightly more than $1B
- The timber REIT market (a subset of the overall REIT market) is slightly larger than $26B

== Public Equity Investing in ETFs ==
Historically investors have gained exposure to this asset via investing in companies or specific strategy (such as REIT or MLP fund). However, in the past few years, several public funds have been started focused on the overall real asset market. The benefit to the individual investor for investing into a single real asset fund to get exposure into the asset class is immediate diversification at a low cost. The two major ETFs in the real asset space are:

- Virtus Real Asset Income ETF (Ticker: VRAI)]: This is the dominant ETF in the asset class. VRAI is a diversified portfolio of income-producing real asset equity securities. VRAI does not invest in commodities because they do not generate income.
- SPDR SSGA Multi-Asset Real Return ETF (Ticker: RLY): This is an ETF of ETFs, This ETF includes commodities, gold, and traditional fixed income (TIPS).

For investors interested in comparing these two ETFs, Indxx did a write-up in October 2019

On the mutual fund side, real asset funds include Nuveen Real Asset Income Fund, T Rowe Price Real Assets Fund, and DWS REEF Real Assets Fund.

In additional several of the largest investment firms have launched private real asset investment strategies for institutional investors. These include Carlyle, KKR and Oaktree.

== See also ==
- Cognitive assets
- Intellectual capital
- Intangible asset
- Tangible common equity
- Tangible property
