= Damour =

Damour الدامور
- City
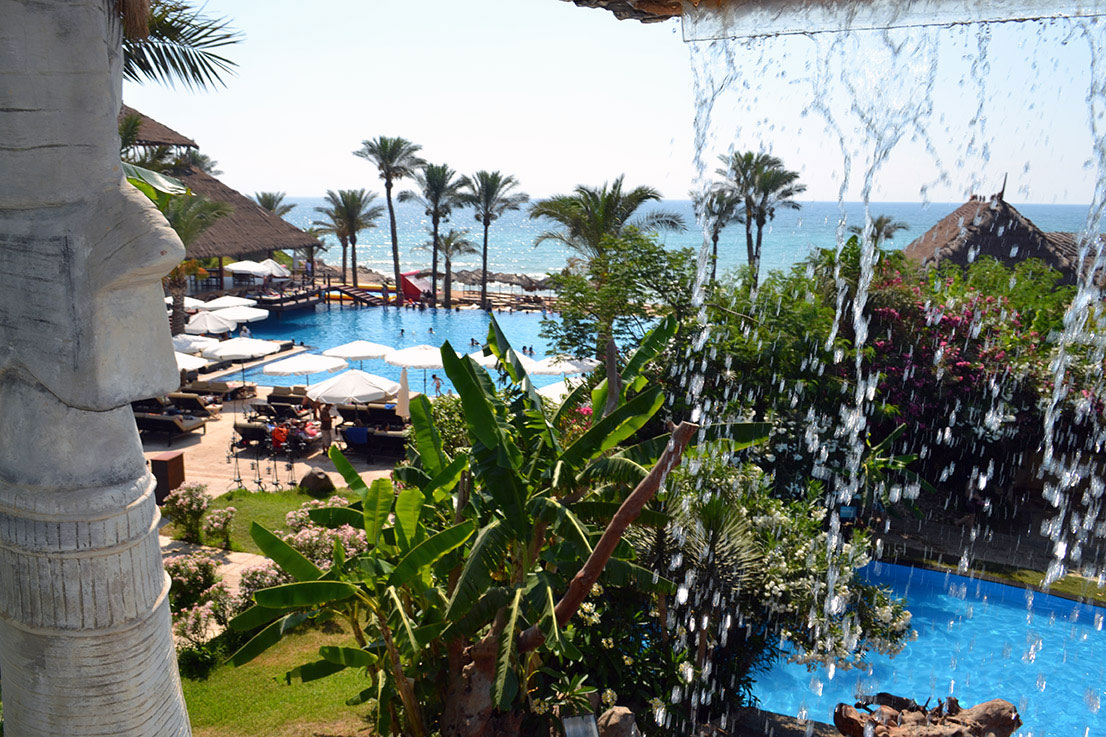
- Janna Sur Mer Resort in Damour

- Location within Lebanon
- Coordinates: 33°44′N 35°27′E
- Country: Lebanon
- Governorate: Mount Lebanon Governorate
- District: Chouf District

Area
  - Total: 10.1 km^{2} (3.9 sq mi)
- Highest elevation: 200 m (660 ft)
- Lowest elevation: 0 m (0 ft)

Population
  - Total: 10,000
  - Density: 990/km^{2} (2,600/sq mi)
- Time zone: UTC+2 (EET)
  - Summer (DST): UTC+3 (EEST)
- Dialing code: +961

Damour (Arabic: الدامور, romanized: ad-Dāmūr) is a coastal town in the Chouf District of the Mount Lebanon Governorate in Lebanon, located about 20 kilometres (12 mi) south of Beirut at the mouth of the Damour River on the Mediterranean coast. Known for silk production since 1843, Damour developed as an important agricultural center during the 20th century especially with its banana plantations. Damour was heavily affected by the Lebanese Civil War, particularly during the 1976 Damour massacre. In recent years, agriculture, agri-food production, and coastal tourism have remained central to the local economy, supported in part by the Agrifood Innovation and Development (AID) Hub established in the town.

== History ==
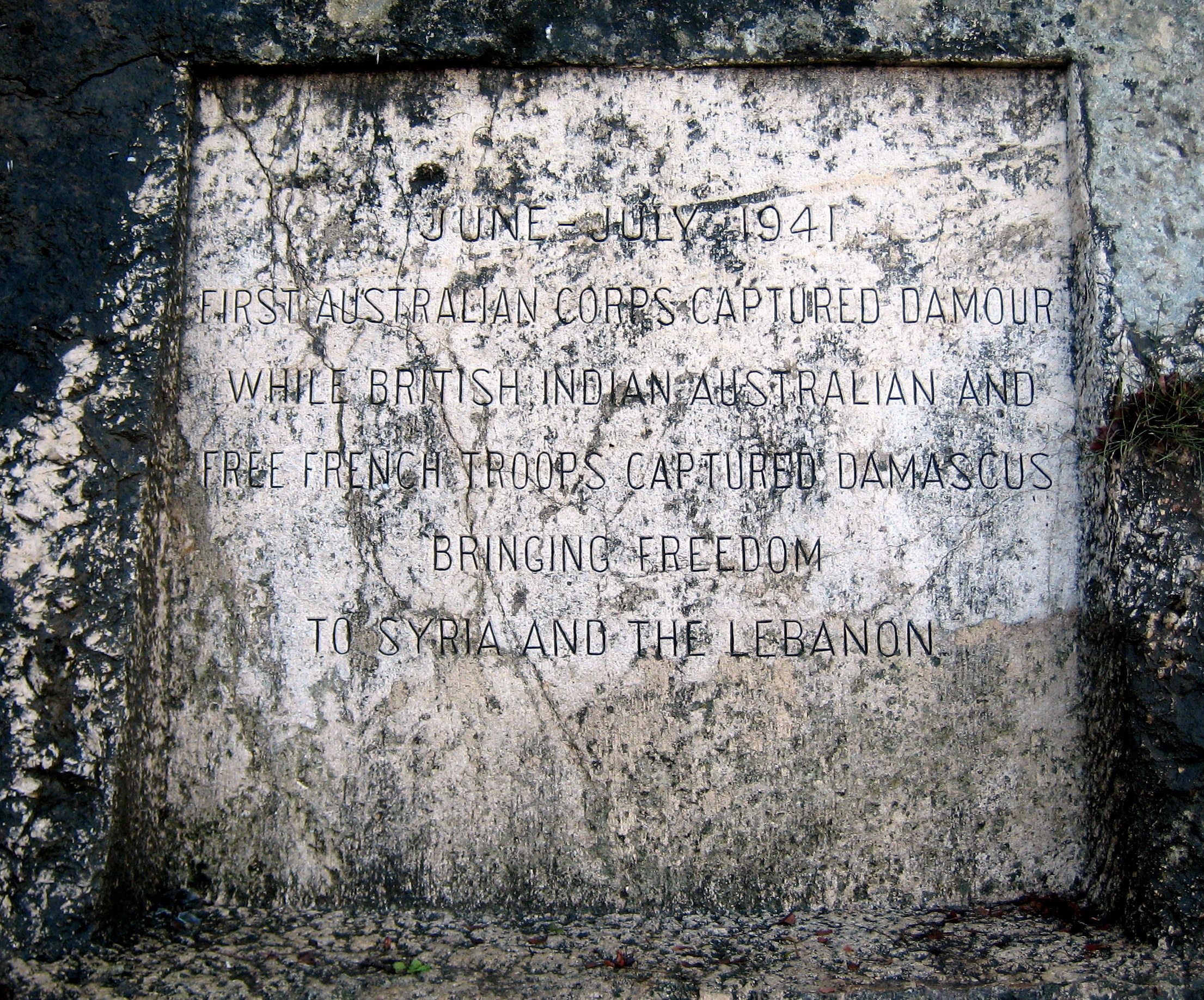
Commemorative plate for the seizure of Damour by the Australians in 1941, installed in Nahr al-Kalb to the north of Beirut.

=== Middle Ages ===
Damour and the surrounding district fell within the territory of the Druze Buhturids of the Gharb, a branch of the Tanukhid dynasty. In 1256 the Crusader lord of Sidon granted farmland in Damour to Buhturid Emmir Jamal al-din Hajji II. In 1302, after the Mamluks took Arwad Island, on 8 June the same year, the Cypriots landed on the Damour River. A battle took place between the Cypriots and the Muslim forces led by Emir Fakhr al-Din Abdel-Hamid bin Jamaluddin Altnokhi and his brother, Emir Shams al-Din Abdullah. The battle was won by Crusaders. Fakhr al-Din Emir was killed, while his brother Shams al-Din fell hostage. He was released after five days for a ransom of three thousand dinars tyrians.

=== Emirate of Mount Lebanon ===
From 1523 to 1842 Damour was part of the Emirate of Mount Lebanon, an autonomous region inside the Ottoman Empire. It was run according to the iqta system of tax farming and the millet system which organized Ottoman subjects along religious distinctions.

=== Late ottoman silk boom ===
In 1843, Antoine-Fortune Portalis established (along with Prosper, Nicolas, Joseph) the first mechanized silk factory in Double Qaim-Maqamate of Mount Lebanon, which was one of the first steps in incorporating the mountain's economy into the world capitalist system, and toward the rise of the importance of silk in the lives and livelihoods of the Lebanese peasantry.

The number of silk filatures in the Mount Lebanon Mutasarrifate expanded from 33 in 1862 to 101 in 1885 and 149 in 1893; in 1905, Damour had five silk factories in operation. Silk production was concentrated alongside mulberry cultivation in the coastal plain, and the wealth it generated funded the construction of substantial mansions associated with the families of industrialists.

In the 19th century, Damour was a flourishing center of the Chouf region. Its plain was then planted with mulberry and had twelve large manufacturing companies. Ten thousand workers and technicians worked in the natural silk industry. The city has a real fascination for the Lebanese worker and attracts the largest majority of the natives in the Sahel region.

=== Late Ottoman sectarian conflict ===
During the last centuries, Damour was located on the central axis of fighting and successive wars.

Damour lay within the southern, predominantly Druze-administered kaymakamate of Mount Lebanon during the period of confessional unrest that culminated in the 1860 Mount Lebanon civil war. Across the wider conflict, at least two hundred villages were destroyed and thousands were killed in fighting between Druze and Maronite communities, with Druze forces emerging militarily victorious after successive assaults on Deir al-Qamar, Zahlé, Hasbaya and Rashaya. European intervention, including French and British forces, followed the violence and led to the establishment of the Mount Lebanon Mutasarrifate in 1861 under the Règlement Organique.

During the civil war that started in 1858, Maronites stood up to the power of the Druze. In April 1860, this resulted in violence carried out by Druze forces, leading to the massacre of several thousand Christians, with estimates ranging from 10,000 to 15,000. In addition, churches and monasteries were plundered.

During World War I, Damour was affected by the 1915 Ottoman Syria locust infestation and the subsequent famine that the infestation caused in Mount Lebanon. The famine caused mass deaths in the town and its surroundings, as recorded by a local priest.

=== French Mandate (1920-1943) ===
In 1941, Damour was the French administrative capital. The Battle of Damour occurred between the 5th-9 July 1941 during World War II in the Syria-Lebanon Campaign. Australian troops, progressing towards the North along the coast, took Damour, held by the French Foreign Legion, faithful to the Vichy Government. A cease-fire was concluded at the end of the battle. There were no more obstacles in the direction of Beirut.

In 1942, South African army engineers built a railway line from Haifa to Beirut along the coast and Australian engineers continued the line to Tripoli.

The railway is no longer in use.

=== Independent Lebanon ===
When the Lebanese Civil War began in 1975, the Chouf coastal areas witnessed demographic changes and a sudden displacement of their residents (particularly the Christians), which occurred in two waves: the first in 1975 and 1976 after the Damour Massacre by militants of the Palestine Liberation Organization (PLO) and as-Sa'iaqa, and the second in 1984-1985, during the so-called Mountain War.

==== 1976 PLO massacre ====
On January 9, 1976, the Lebanese National Movement and the PLO laid siege to Damour. On January 20, 1976, thousands of militants from the PLO committed a massacre of the inhabitants in revenge for a massacre of Palestinians in the Karantina district of Beirut. The massacre resulted in the killing of 582 Christians, the destruction of homes, and bodies left on the street for days.

==== 1982 Israeli Attack ====
During 1982 Lebanon War, the Israeli Air Force bombed Beirut and other several cities in the south, including Damour. On June 10, 1982, Colonel Eli Geva's 211th Brigade trespassed Damour moving towards Khalde, south of Beirut.

==== Mountain War ====
Edgar O'Ballance's book “Civil War in Lebanon” details the impact of the Mountain War on Damour.

==== 2006 Israeli attack ====
During the 2006 Lebanon War, the Israeli Air Force destroyed several bridges on Highway Beirut-Tyre and on the Damour River.

== Archaeology ==
=== The Historical Bridge ===
Adjacent to an iron bridge at the mouth of the Damour river, possibly built in the 19th century, lie stone foundations of an earlier structure. Its visible remains include a masonry abutment on the left bank, foundation traces on the right, and ruins of what was possibly a pier within a small island in the middle of the river.

Historical evidence points to a medieval bridge constructed in 1291 during the reign Mamluk Sultan al-Ashraf Khalīl after the conquest of Sidon and Beirut, and rebuilt in 1340 and 1344. It may have been destroyed due to heavy rain and flooding in 1503–1504.

Further archaeological evidence dates back to the era of Emir Bachir Chehab II, who ordered its construction in 1815. It was replaced by a large French mandate period bridge which stands to this day.

=== Heritage ===
The structures of Damour's 18th and 19th-century silk industry, which brought the town considerable prosperity through trade with European markets, are a distinct part of its remaining heritage. Silk factories remain visible today, accompanied by the partially collapsed remains of a glass factory.The wealth generated by silk production funded the construction of fine examples of traditional Lebanese mansions and large houses during the 19th and early 20th centuries, several of which survive in damaged condition. Contemporary with the early-19th-century industrial works of Emir Bashir Shihab II, an extensive aqueduct was constructed in the same period to supply water both to the agricultural plain and to the silk and glass factories. Sections of the aqueduct survive in fair condition and remain a recognisable landmark, although other sections have been rebuilt in cement block. Together, the surviving aqueduct, silk factories and glass-factory remains constitute the tangible evidence of what was once a thriving industrial economy linked to the broader silk economy of Mount Lebanon and the coast.

== Geography ==
The town lies within the Damour River basin, one of Lebanon's seventeen perennial river systems, and much of its coastal plain is occupied by banana plantations. Damour has a Mediterranean climate, though studies project increasing water stress and declining precipitation in the basin due to climate change. The town is named after the Damour river, which is named after the Phoenician god Damoros, otherwise known as Tamyrus.

The river originates at an elevation of 1,948 metres at the Nabaa al-Safa and Nabaa al-Barouk springs and runs 38 kilometres to the Mediterranean Sea, draining a watershed of approximately 290 km^{2}. The watershed is bordered by the Nahr Beirut basin to the north, the Nahr Awali basin to the south, and the Nahr Litani basin to the east. Two diversion dams on the river feed irrigation networks, the lower one diverting approximately 1,100 m^{3}/h and the upper one approximately 650 m^{3}/h.

The Damour basin's geology is dominated by Jurassic limestone and dolomite surrounded by Cretaceous, Tertiary, and Quaternary deposits. Karstic formations represent approximately 27 percent of the watershed (3 percent Jurassic and 24 percent Middle Cretaceous). Thick layers of karstic limestone form the major aquifer system, with faults interconnecting the mountain aquifers with those of the coastal plain. The Damour coastal aquifer is a significant source for irrigation and municipal water supply in the surrounding area; hydrochemical and isotopic studies have shown that pumped groundwater is largely recharged locally within the coastal plain, with up to 30 percent originating from recharge in the high mountains of the upper basin.

70% of the coastal plains West of Damour are used for banana plantations. Further scrublands complement the plantations in the coastal parts of Damour, whereas the Eastern hills are dominated by woodlands.

The Beirut-Tyre Highway separates the plantations. Now dismantled, the track is a stopover. Damour is the second largest urban settlement located across the western part of the Damour river.

== Climate ==
Damour has a mild mediterranean climate (Köppen climate classification: Csa) with moderately warm and dry summers and moderately cold, windy, and wet winters. Roughly 80 to 90 percent of total annual precipitation falls between November and March, with scattered rainfall events beginning in October and ending in May. Snowmelt occurring between March and May constitutes a significant source of fresh water for Damour.

Climate data for Damour
Month	Jan	Feb	Mar	Apr	May	Jun	Jul	Aug	Sep	Oct	Nov	Dec	Year
Mean daily maximum °C (°F)	13.2 (55.8)	14.3 (57.7)	16.9 (62.4)	20.1 (68.2)	24.1 (75.4)	27.3 (81.1)	29.5 (85.1)	29.7 (85.5)	28.0 (82.4)	24.8 (76.6)	19.8 (67.6)	15.3 (59.5)	21.9 (71.4)
Daily mean °C (°F)	9.1 (48.4)	9.9 (49.8)	12.4 (54.3)	15.5 (59.9)	19.5 (67.1)	22.8 (73.0)	25.0 (77.0)	25.2 (77.4)	23.5 (74.3)	20.2 (68.4)	15.1 (59.2)	11.0 (51.8)	17.4 (63.4)
Mean daily minimum °C (°F)	5.3 (41.5)	5.8 (42.4)	7.8 (46.0)	10.5 (50.9)	14.2 (57.6)	17.9 (64.2)	20.3 (68.5)	20.8 (69.4)	19.2 (66.6)	15.9 (60.6)	10.9 (51.6)	7.3 (45.1)	13.0 (55.4)
Average precipitation mm (inches)	125 (4.9)	125 (4.9)	96 (3.8)	48 (1.9)	20 (0.8)	3 (0.1)	1 (0.0)	1 (0.0)	7 (0.3)	28 (1.1)	66 (2.6)	109 (4.3)	629 (24.7)
Source: Climate-Data.org (1991-2021)

Lebanon-wide projections indicate continued decline in precipitation, with reductions of 5 to 9 percent by mid-century under RCP 4.5 and up to 11 percent by 2100 under RCP 8.5. Hydrological modelling specific to the Damour basin using a modified Soil and Water Assessment Tool projects, under RCP 4.5 for the year 2032 against a 2008 baseline, a 20 percent decline in precipitation on the coastal portion of the basin and a 30 percent decline in the mountainous portion, with maximum temperatures rising by 2 percent on the coast and 8 percent in the mountains. Mean monthly water yield is projected to decrease by approximately 24 percent, with the largest decline occurring in January (averaging 84 percent across sub-basins) and significant water shortage anticipated between March and October. Observed evidence of climate change in the wider region includes a recorded decrease in snow residence time across Lebanon from 110 to 85 days. The February 2005 storm is documented as among the strongest precipitation events recorded in the basin.

Surface water quality along the river was assessed annually between 2005 and 2009. Using the Water Quality Index, the river was classified overall as "good" but as "medium" at the estuary, where readings reflect cumulative impacts from upstream villages and recreational activity.

== Religion ==
In 2014, Christians made up 95.98% of registered voters in Damour. 84.87% of the voters were Maronite Catholics.

There are six churches in Damour, of which Notre-Dame de Damour and St Élias are the biggest. There are also three other chapels, including Sainte Thècle, St Michel, which was the first church in Damour, St Maroun and St Joseph. These six churches are all Maronite Churches. Before the Lebanese Civil War, Damour had another Catholic church, Savior's Church.

In the mid-nineteenth century the Maronite Church was a key political player in Mount Lebanon, being a major landowner, owning about a third of all lands in the region.

== Economy ==
=== Agriculture ===
Damour's economy has historically been centered on coastal agriculture, particularly banana cultivation, which occupies much of the Damour plain and contributes significantly to Lebanon's agricultural production. During the 19th century, the town was also an important center for silk production, with several silk factories operating in the area before the decline of the silk industry in the 1930s. Following the collapse of silk production, mulberry cultivation was gradually replaced by citrus orchards and later by banana plantations.

Agriculture remains an important source of livelihood in Damour and surrounding villages. Women play a significant role in farming, irrigation management, food preservation, and small-scale agricultural production. However, the sector faces challenges linked to climate change, including water shortages, irregular rainfall, and declining water quality, which have affected agricultural productivity and household incomes. Local reports have also identified problems such as water salinity in artesian wells, inefficient irrigation systems, and declining banana production, contributing to reduced agricultural income and the abandonment of farmland.

In recent years, efforts have been made to modernize Damour's agricultural economy through agro-industrial investment and innovation. The Agrifood Innovation and Development (AID) Hub in Damour was established to support sustainable growth in the agricultural and agri-food sectors across the Chouf and South Lebanon regions. The hub provides facilities for fruit drying and juicing, olive oil and honey processing, cold storage, and food quality control, while also offering training and incubation services for farmers and agricultural entrepreneurs.

=== Tourism ===
Damour, one of the few coastal cities in Lebanon with a sandy beach, is just ten minutes from Beirut. This proximity makes it a popular destination for tourists, particularly water sports enthusiasts. However, local development studies have cited limited infrastructure, weak investment, and insufficient support for eco-tourism as obstacles to economic growth. At the same time, parts of the coastal plain have increasingly been targeted for high-end beach resorts and real estate development, placing pressure on agricultural land use.

Fecal and total coliform bacteria counts exceeded European Economic Community’s Bathing Waters Directive 2006 throughout the studied section. This indicates public-health risk for swimmers, which has an effect on tourists.

== Neighborhoods ==
- Mar Thecla El Naame
- Mar Mikhael Al Damour
- Khiyam Al Damour
- Saadiyat
- Ghandouriyeh
- Missiar

== Notable people ==
- Charles Ghafari
- Halim Ghafari
- Elie Saab
- Michel Aoun
- Georges Akl
- Rose Ghorayeb – Lebanese author and literary critic
- Mario Aoun (Minister)

== Gallery ==
Damour views

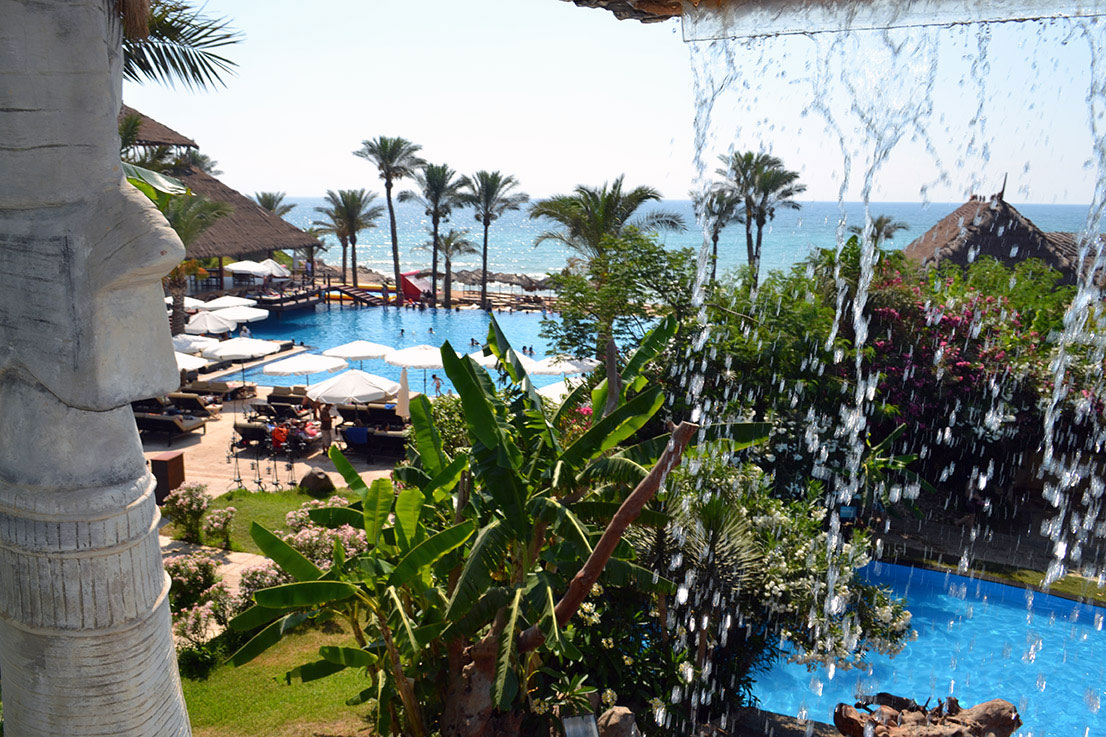

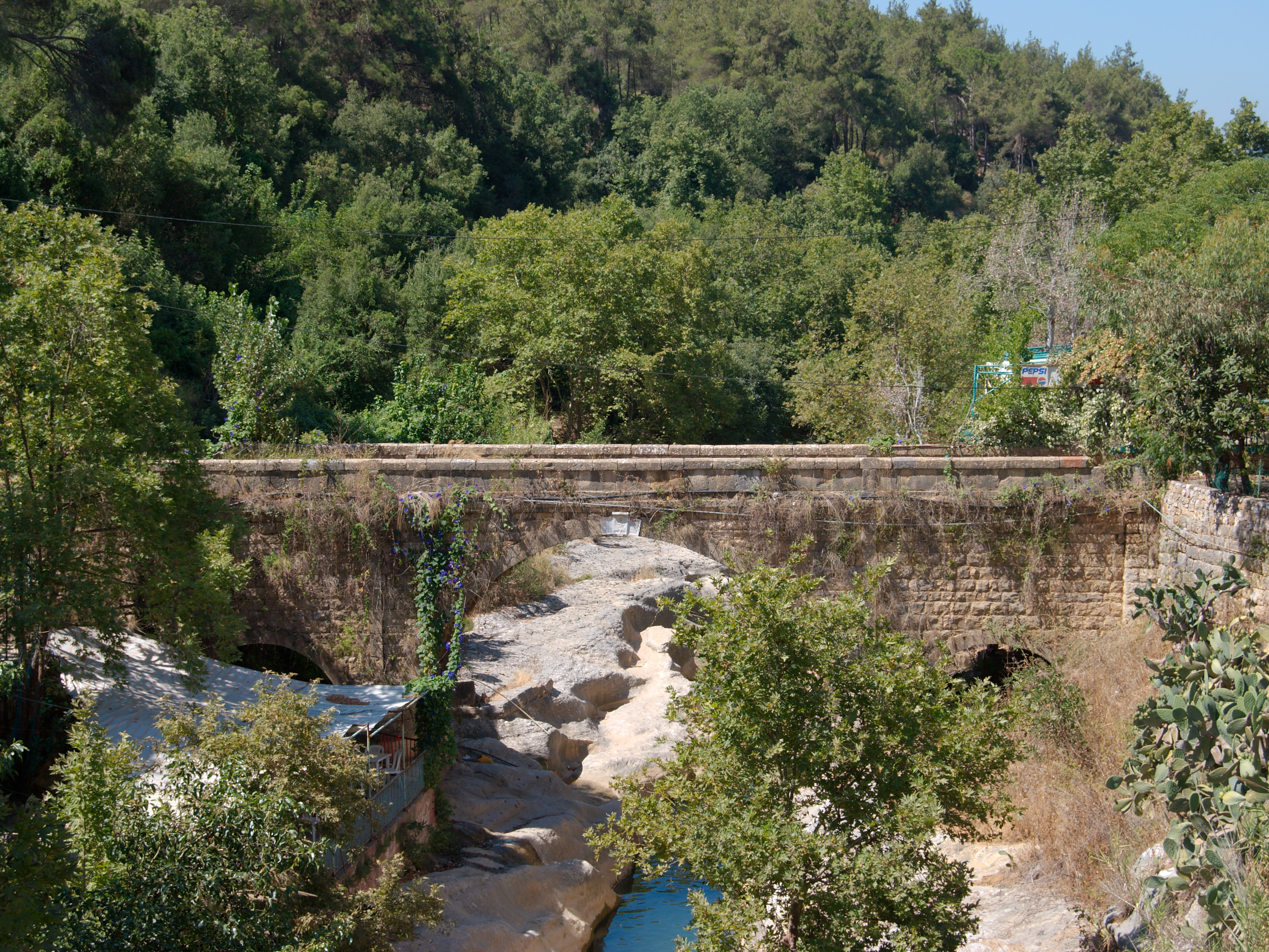

== See also ==
- Damour river
- Battle of Damour (1941)
- Damour massacre

== Bibliography ==
Makhzoumi, Jala; Chmaitelly, Hala; Lteif, Carine (27 June 2012). "Holistic Conservation of Bio-Cultural Diversity in Coastal Lebanon: A Landscape Approach". Journal of Marine and Island Cultures. 1 (1). doi:10.1016/j.imic.2012.04.003. Retrieved 27 May 2026.

Massoud, M.A. (2011). "Assessment of Water Quality Along a Recreational Section of the Damour River in Lebanon Using the Water Quality Index". Environmental Monitoring and Assessment. 184 (7): 4151–4160. doi:10.1007/s10661-011-2251-z.

Harik, G.; Alameddine, I.; Abou Najm, M.; El-Fadel, M. (2023). "Modified SWAT to Forecast Water Availability in Mediterranean Mountainous Watersheds with Snowmelt Dominated Runoff". Water Resources Management. 37 (5): 1985–2000. doi:10.1007/s11269-023-03466-4.

"The Agrifood Innovation and Development (AID) Hub – Damour Unit". Arcenciel. Retrieved 29 May 2026.

Boas, Adrian J. "On a Bridge over Troubled Water". Adrian J. Boas. Retrieved 27 May 2026.

Saad, Z.; Kazpard, V.A.; Geyh, M.A.; Slim, K. (2004). "Chemical and Isotopic Composition of Water from Springs and Wells in the Damour River Basin and the Coastal Plain in Lebanon". Journal of Environmental Hydrology. 12 (Paper 18): 1–13.

Sbytte, Ghida Ali (December 2022). Reclaiming Coastal Riparian Landscapes: The Case of Damour River, Lebanon (Thesis). Beirut, Lebanon: American University of Beirut.

"Climate: Damour". Retrieved 8 May 2025.

MedECC (Mediterranean Experts on Climate and Environmental Change) (2020). Climate and Environmental Change in the Mediterranean Basin – Current Situation and Risks for the Future. First Mediterranean Assessment Report.

"التوزيع حسب المذاهب للناخبين/ناخبات في بلدة الدامور، قضاء الشوف محافظة جبل لبنان في لبنان".

Traboulsi, Fawwaz (2012). A History of Modern Lebanon (2nd ed.). Pluto Press. ISBN 9781849647281.

Salibi, Kamal (January 1961). "The Buḥturids of the Garb: Mediaeval Lords of Beirut and of Southern Lebanon". Arabica. 8: 74–97.

Khater, Akram (1996). "'House' to 'Goddess of the House': Gender, Class, and Silk in 19th-Century Mount Lebanon". International Journal of Middle East Studies. 28 (3): 325–348.

Lee, Jessica (2014). Beirut (2nd ed.). Footprint Focus. Bath: Bradt Travel Guides. p. 81. ISBN 978-1-910120-13-2.

Anderson, Betty S. (2015). A History of the Modern Middle East: Rulers, Rebels, and Rogues. Stanford, California: Stanford University Press. p. 115. ISBN 978-0-8047-8324-8.

Heraclides, Alexis; Dialla, Ada (2015). "Intervention in Lebanon and Syria, 1860–61". In Humanitarian Intervention in the Long Nineteenth Century. Manchester University Press. p. 137. doi:10.2307/j.ctt1mf71b8.12. JSTOR j.ctt1mf71b8.12.

"Battle of Damour". Australian War Memorial. Retrieved 15 May 2025.

"Syrian Campaign". Australian War Memorial. Retrieved 18 May 2025.

Orpen, Neil; Martin, H. J. (1981). Salute the Sappers: South African Forces, World War II: Part 1. Johannesburg: Sappers Association. ISBN 0620053763.

Saksouk, Abir. "The Apprehensions of the Past in Building the Future". Public Works Magazine. Retrieved 29 May 2026.

Sayigh, Yezid (1983). "Israel's Military Performance in Lebanon, June 1982". Journal of Palestine Studies. 13 (1): 33. doi:10.2307/2536925. JSTOR 2536925.

AP Archive (28 July 2015). Aftermath of Airstrike on Damour Bridge. YouTube. Retrieved 22 May 2025.

Petersen, Andrew (2020). "Roman, Medieval or Ottoman: Historic Bridges of the Lebanon Coast". In Bridge of Civilizations: The Near East and Europe c. 1100–1300. Archaeopress Publishing. pp. 184–187. ISBN 978-1-78969-328-7.

"Coastal Area Management Programme Lebanon: Damour" (PDF). CAMP-Lebanon. Retrieved 29 May 2026.

"Women and Water at the Heart of Climate Change: Voices from Damour, Lebanon". United Nations Environment Programme. 18 March 2026. Retrieved 29 May 2026.

"Stability and Local Development (SLD) Plan Damour" (PDF). United Nations Development Programme. Retrieved 29 May 2026.
