= Hidden profile =

Paradigm that occurs in the process of group decision making

A hidden profile is a paradigm that occurs in the process of group decision making. It is found in a situation when part of some information is shared among group members (i.e. all members possess this information prior to discussion), whereas other pieces of information are unshared (i.e. information known to only one member prior to discussion). Furthermore, shared information and unshared information have different decisional implications, and the alternative implied by the unshared information is the correct one given all information available to the group. However, no group member can detect this best solution on the basis of his or her individual information prior to discussion; it can only be found by pooling the unshared information during group discussion. This topic is one of many topics studied in social psychology.

== History ==
In 1981 two researchers, Garold Stasser and William Titus, set out to challenge strongly-held beliefs about group decision making. The researchers attempted to use a number of formal models to identify what would happen when people are not fully informed. One of these was the persuasive argument theory (PAT). The theory, in this case, would state that polarization of judgments is due to culturally pooled arguments. This will bolster popularly held beliefs and arguments, yet not take into account unshared information. The novelty of arguments, on the other hand, does create change, but PAT assumes they are consistent with the norm. Stasser and Titus posit that this is not always the case. Through providing selective, unique information, they felt they could separate informational influence and normative influence. Though they ultimately found opposing results, they had devised hidden profiles.

== Causes ==
Hidden profiles occur when some information is shared among group members and other pieces of information remain unshared. This phenomenon has a tendency to co-occur and interact with the shared information bias to produce poor decisions. Though each person in a group will have unique knowledge, group members will have the propensity to discuss already shared information. The motivation to do so will be to reach a consensus. This, however, does not yield the optimal decision choice. Initial decision preferences differ from what is ideal, but integrating the unique knowledge of individual group members will allow the optimal decision to be realized.

Stewart and Stasser (1998) state that shared information bias, and in turn hidden profiles, occur more often for judgment-based tasks because of the ultimate goal of reaching consensus. To support this, a meta-analysis of information sharing and teams by Mesmer-Magnus and DeChurch (2009) found that information sharing most affected intellectual tasks. These findings supported Laughlin’s (1980, 1996) claim that intellectual tasks require more information sharing. That is, tasks featuring a hidden profile were less affected by the shared information bias when they were intellectually based (i.e., goal of correctness) rather than judgmentally based (i.e., goal of consensus).

One issue with hidden profiles is the time dedicated to discussion. Shared and unshared information are markedly different in the amount time each is debated in group discussion. In other words, shared information is discussed far more often than novel, unshared information. This unbalanced approach to group decision making does not yield optimal decision choices. This effect is even more prominent for judgmental tasks, as discussed above. Due to this, though an optimal decision is attainable, it will likely not be realized. In hidden profile situations, groups rarely find the alternative decision, likely the optimal one.

One’s affect may also have an effect. When in a group setting, the unbalanced time dedication to shared information may be due to the uncomfortable nature of sharing novel, unique information. Discussing shared information can help to enhance other’s evaluation of a person, while unique information may impair on evaluation. As well, affect does influence reception of knowledge. In a series of studies, it was found that knowledge transfer of novel ideas is greater for those with a positive affect rather than those with a negative affect. This trend does not implicate the sender of information, but the receiver. However, if pairs are affect-congruent (negative-negative, positive-positive) rather than affect-incongruent, knowledge transfer is greater.

== See also ==
- Shared information bias
- Group decision making
- Groupthink
