= Decision support system =

Information systems supporting business or organizational decision-making activities

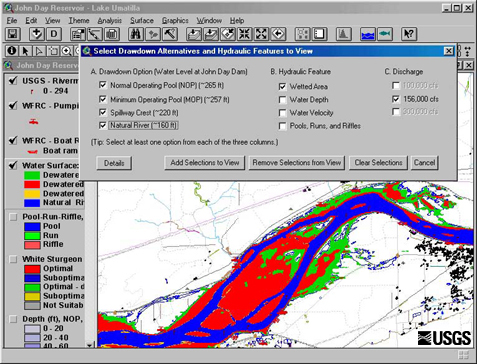
Example of a decision support system for John Day Reservoir

A decision support system (DSS) is an information system that supports business or organizational decision-making activities. DSSs serve the management, operations and planning levels of an organization (usually mid and higher management) and help people make decisions about problems that may be rapidly changing and not easily specified in advance—i.e., unstructured and semi-structured decision problems. Decision support systems can be either fully computerized or human-powered, or a combination of both.

While academics have perceived DSS as a tool to support decision making processes, DSS users see DSS as a tool to facilitate organizational processes. Some authors have extended the definition of DSS to include any system that might support decision making and some DSS include a decision-making software component; Sprague (1980) defines a properly termed DSS as follows:

1. DSS tends to be aimed at the less well structured, underspecified problem that upper level managers typically face;
2. DSS attempts to combine the use of models or analytic techniques with traditional data access and retrieval functions;
3. DSS specifically focuses on features which make them easy to use by non-computer-proficient people in an interactive mode; and
4. DSS emphasizes flexibility and adaptability to accommodate changes in the environment and the decision making approach of the user.

DSSs include knowledge-based systems. A properly designed DSS is an interactive software-based system intended to help decision makers compile useful information from a combination of raw data, documents, personal knowledge, and/or business models to identify and solve problems and make decisions.

Typical information that a decision support application might gather and present includes:

- inventories of information assets (including legacy and relational data sources, cubes, data warehouses, and data marts),
- comparative sales figures between one period and the next,
- projected revenue figures based on product sales assumptions.

== History ==
The concept of decision support has evolved mainly from the theoretical studies of organizational decision making done at the Carnegie Institute of Technology during the late 1950s and early 1960s, and the implementation work done in the 1960s. DSS became an area of research of its own in the middle of the 1970s, before gaining in intensity during the 1980s.

In the middle and late 1980s, executive information systems (EIS), group decision support systems (GDSS), and organizational decision support systems (ODSS) evolved from the single user and model-oriented DSS. According to Sol (1987), the definition and scope of DSS have been migrating over the years: in the 1970s DSS was described as "a computer-based system to aid decision making"; in the late 1970s the DSS movement started focusing on "interactive computer-based systems which help decision-makers utilize data bases and models to solve ill-structured problems"; in the 1980s DSS should provide systems "using suitable and available technology to improve effectiveness of managerial and professional activities", and towards the end of 1980s DSS faced a new challenge towards the design of intelligent workstations.

In 1987, Texas Instruments completed development of the Gate Assignment Display System (GADS) for United Airlines. This decision support system is credited with significantly reducing travel delays by aiding the management of ground operations at various airports, beginning with O'Hare International Airport in Chicago and Stapleton Airport in Denver, Colorado. Beginning in about 1990, data warehousing and on-line analytical processing (OLAP) began broadening the realm of DSS. As the turn of the millennium approached, new Web-based analytical applications were introduced.

DSS also have a weak connection to the user interface paradigm of hypertext. Both the University of Vermont PROMIS system (for medical decision making) and the Carnegie Mellon ZOG/KMS system (for military and business decision making) were decision support systems which also were major breakthroughs in user interface research. Furthermore, although hypertext researchers have generally been concerned with information overload, certain researchers, notably Douglas Engelbart, have been focused on decision makers in particular.

The advent of more and better reporting technologies has seen DSS start to emerge as a critical component of management design. Examples of this can be seen in the intense amount of discussion of DSS in the education environment.

== Applications ==
DSS can theoretically be built in any knowledge domain. One example is the clinical decision support system for medical diagnosis. There are four stages in the evolution of clinical decision support system (CDSS): the primitive version is standalone and does not support integration; the second generation supports integration with other medical systems; the third is standard-based, and the fourth is service model-based.

DSS is extensively used in business and management. Executive dashboard and other business performance software allow faster decision making, identification of negative trends, and better allocation of business resources. Due to DSS, all the information from any organization is represented in the form of charts, graphs i.e. in a summarized way, which helps the management to take strategic decisions. For example, one of the DSS applications is the management and development of complex anti-terrorism systems. Other examples include a bank loan officer verifying the credit of a loan applicant or an engineering firm that has bids on several projects and wants to know if they can be competitive with their costs.

A growing area of DSS application, concepts, principles, and techniques is in agricultural production, marketing for sustainable development. Agricultural DSSes began to be developed and promoted in the 1990s. For example, the DSSAT4 package, The Decision Support System for Agrotechnology Transfer developed through financial support of USAID during the 1980s and 1990s, has allowed rapid assessment of several agricultural production systems around the world to facilitate decision-making at the farm and policy levels. Precision agriculture seeks to tailor decisions to particular portions of farm fields. There are, however, many constraints to the successful adoption of DSS in agriculture.

DSS is also prevalent in forest management where the long planning horizon and the spatial dimension of planning problems demand specific requirements. All aspects of Forest management, from log transportation, harvest scheduling to sustainability and ecosystem protection have been addressed by modern DSSs. In this context, the consideration of single or multiple management objectives related to the provision of goods and services that are traded or non-traded and often subject to resource constraints and decision problems. The Community of Practice of Forest Management Decision Support Systems provides a large repository on knowledge about the construction and use of forest Decision Support Systems.

A specific example concerns the Canadian National Railway system, which tests its equipment on a regular basis using a decision support system. A problem faced by any railroad is worn-out or defective rails, which can result in hundreds of derailments per year. Under a DSS, the Canadian National Railway system managed to decrease the incidence of derailments at the same time other companies were experiencing an increase.

DSS has been used for risk assessment to interpret monitoring data from large engineering structures such as dams, towers, cathedrals, or masonry buildings. For instance, Mistral is an expert system to monitor dam safety, developed in the 1990s by Ismes (Italy). It gets data from an automatic monitoring system and performs a diagnosis of the state of the dam. Its first copy, installed in 1992 on the Ridracoli Dam (Italy), is still operational 24/7/365. It has been installed on several dams in Italy and abroad (e.g., Itaipu Dam in Brazil), and on monuments under the name of Kaleidos. Mistral is a registered trade mark of CESI. GIS has been successfully used since the '90s in conjunction with DSS, to show on a map real-time risk evaluations based on monitoring data gathered in the area of the Val Pola disaster (Italy).

One of an open source projects is Bank Branch Performance DSS which is a decision support system that evaluates the performance of bank branches. It uses a stacking-based predictive model to analyze operational, financial, and digital data from multiple branches. The system combines 30 key performance indicators to generate evidence-based assessments, with output scores ranging from 1 to 4, where higher scores indicate stronger branch performance.

Decision support systems are increasingly used in the evaluation of software projects, where they analyze structured and unstructured data. In such cases, these systems may include automated assessment models that generate performance assessments and recommendations based on specific criteria. Automated assessment of software projects refers to a set of methods and systems designed to objectively and reproducibly measure the quality of a software project based on its digital artifacts — primarily the source code — without requiring direct human intervention at every stage of the process.

== Components ==
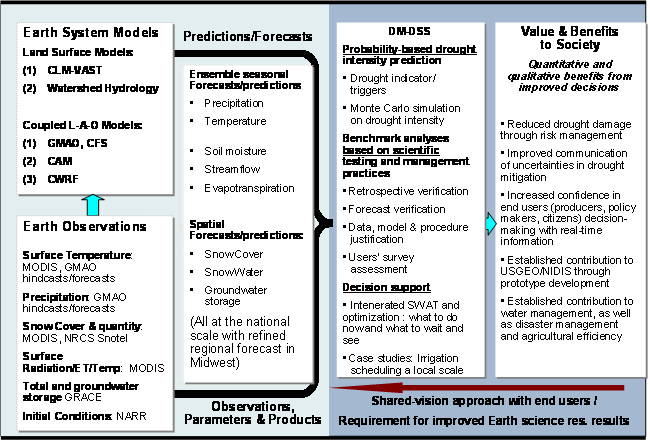
Design of a drought mitigation decision support system

Three fundamental components of a DSS architecture are:

1. the database (or knowledge base),
2. the model (i.e., the decision context and user criteria)
3. the user interface.

The users themselves are also important components of the architecture.

== Taxonomies ==
Using the relationship with the user as the criterion, Haettenschwiler differentiates passive, active, and cooperative DSS. A passive DSS is a system that aids the process of decision making, but that cannot bring out explicit decision suggestions or solutions. An active DSS can bring out such decision suggestions or solutions. A cooperative DSS allows for an iterative process between human and system towards the achievement of a consolidated solution: the decision maker (or its advisor) can modify, complete, or refine the decision suggestions provided by the system, before sending them back to the system for validation, and likewise the system again improves, completes, and refines the suggestions of the decision maker and sends them back to them for validation.

Another taxonomy for DSS, according to the mode of assistance, has been created by D. Power: he differentiates communication-driven DSS, data-driven DSS, document-driven DSS, knowledge-driven DSS, and model-driven DSS.

- A communication-driven DSS enables cooperation, supporting more than one person working on a shared task; examples include integrated tools like Google Docs or Microsoft SharePoint Workspace.
- A data-driven DSS (or data-oriented DSS) emphasizes access to and manipulation of a time series of internal company data and, sometimes, external data.
- A document-driven DSS manages, retrieves, and manipulates unstructured information in a variety of electronic formats.
- A knowledge-driven DSS provides specialized problem-solving expertise stored as facts, rules, procedures or in similar structures like interactive decision trees and flowcharts.
- A model-driven DSS emphasizes access to and manipulation of a statistical, financial, optimization, or simulation model. Model-driven DSS use data and parameters provided by users to assist decision makers in analyzing a situation; they are not necessarily data-intensive. Dicodess is an example of an open-source model-driven DSS generator.

Using scope as the criterion, Power differentiates enterprise-wide DSS and desktop DSS. An enterprise-wide DSS is linked to large data warehouses and serves many managers in the company. A desktop, single-user DSS is a small system that runs on an individual manager's PC.

== Development frameworks ==
Similarly to other systems, DSS systems require a structured approach. Such a framework includes people, technology, and the development approach.

The Early Framework of Decision Support System consists of four phases:

- Intelligence – Searching for conditions that call for decision;
- Design – Developing and analyzing possible alternative actions of solution;
- Choice – Selecting a course of action among those;
- Implementation – Adopting the selected course of action in decision situation.

DSS technology levels (of hardware and software) may include:

1. The actual application that will be used by the user. This is the part of the application that allows the decision maker to make decisions in a particular problem area. The user can act upon that particular problem.
2. Generator contains Hardware/software environment that allows people to easily develop specific DSS applications. This level makes use of case tools or systems such as Crystal, Analytica and iThink.
3. Tools include lower level hardware/software. DSS generators including special languages, function libraries and linking modules

An iterative developmental approach allows for the DSS to be changed and redesigned at various intervals. Once the system is designed, it will need to be tested and revised where necessary for the desired outcome.

== Classification ==
There are several ways to classify DSS applications. Not every DSS fits neatly into one of the categories, but may be a mix of two or more architectures.

Holsapple and Whinston classify DSS into the following six frameworks: text-oriented DSS, database-oriented DSS, spreadsheet-oriented DSS, solver-oriented DSS, rule-oriented DSS, and compound DSS. A compound DSS is the most popular classification for a DSS; it is a hybrid system that includes two or more of the five basic structures.

The support given by DSS can be separated into three distinct, interrelated categories: Personal Support, Group Support, and Organizational Support.

DSS components may be classified as:

1. Inputs: Factors, numbers, and characteristics to analyze
2. User knowledge and expertise: Inputs requiring manual analysis by the user
3. Outputs: Transformed data from which DSS "decisions" are generated
4. Decisions: Results generated by the DSS based on user criteria

DSSs which perform selected cognitive decision-making functions and are based on artificial intelligence or intelligent agents technologies are called intelligent decision support systems (IDSS)

The nascent field of decision engineering treats the decision itself as an engineered object, and applies engineering principles such as design and quality assurance to an explicit representation of the elements that make up a decision.

== See also ==
- Argument map
- Cognitive assets (organizational)
- Decision theory
- Enterprise decision management
- Expert system
- Information assurance
- Integrative thinking
- Judge–advisor system
- Knapsack problem
- Land allocation decision support system
- List of concept- and mind-mapping software
- Morphological analysis (problem-solving)
- Online deliberation
- Participation (decision making)
- Predictive analytics
- Project management software
- Self-service software
- Spatial decision support system
- Strategic planning software
