= GIS and RS (University of Pune) =

The Remote Sensing and Geospatial Information System training centre is located in University of Pune, India's premier institute for graduate and postgraduate courses. The GIS and RS courses are offered under the Department of Geography.

== History ==
GIS and RS training at the University of Pune started in June 2001 as a one-year diploma course for students from interdisciplinary backgrounds. Dr. (Ms.) Vrishali Deosthali initiated the course, aiming to produce professionals equipped with sound knowledge and practical experience for the remote sensing and GIS industry. Due to its immense popularity, a two-year postgraduate program in geoinformatics was introduced in June 2006. The course coordinator is Dr. V.S. Kale, the head of the geography department.

== Infrastructure ==
From the course's inception, classes were held in seminar halls of various university departments due to a lack of infrastructure. Furthermore, practical training in GIS and RS technologies was conducted in labs that could not accommodate the growing number of students each year. In July 2008, the University of Pune allocated funds for constructing independent spaces for geoinformatics laboratories and classrooms. The department now has a new building constructed in 2014. All classes are held in the new classrooms.

== Technologies ==
The various topics that are covered in its diploma and degree courses are listed below

- Geographic Information Systems
- Remote Sensing
- Global Positioning Systems
- Spatial Decision Support Systems
- Digital Photogrammetry
- Geostatistics
- Programming
- Data Mining
