= Inventors Assistance League =

Non profit organisation

Inventors Assistance League (IAL) is a non-profit organization created to assist inventors, small businesses and entrepreneurs. Its parent organization, the National Inventor's Foundation, was the very first federally chartered non-profit group to serve creative individuals since patent laws were established in 1790.

Founder and original president Ted De Boer was a patent agent with US Trademark and Copyright Office. He created the organization in 1962 (and formalized with the State of California in 1970) when he became frustrated with the lack of affordable legal advice and guidance for inventors.

The organization helps individuals file for a trademark or patent, file for a copyright, learn to market their inventions and get Pre-Patent Protection.

The Better Business Bureau rates the Inventors Assistance League with an A+ Rating, its highest possible rating. The Inventors Assistance League has its office in Los Angeles (Eagle Rock), California.
