= Battle of Damour =

Battle of World War II

Coordinates: 33°44′N 35°27′E

- Part of the Syria–Lebanon campaign of World War II
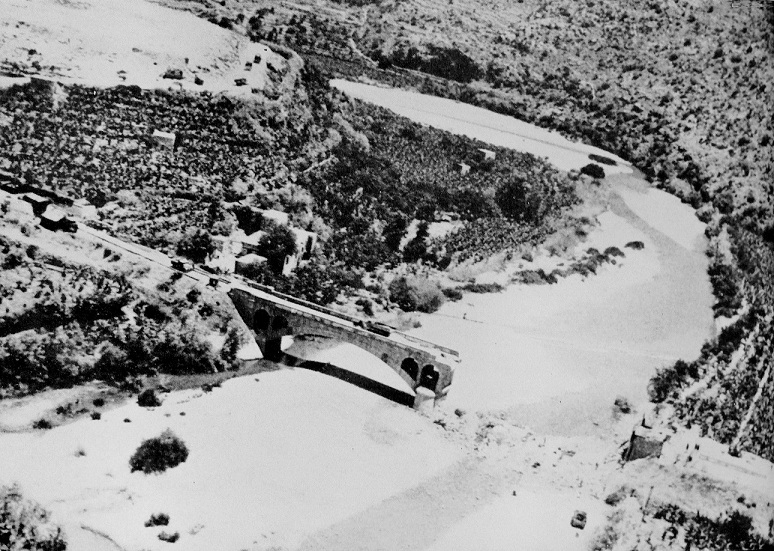
- The broken bridge at the mouth of the Damour river
| Date | 5–9 July 1941 |
| Location | Damour, French Lebanon |
| Result | Australian victory |

Belligerents
| Australia | Vichy France: French Lebanon |

Commanders and leaders
| (Australia) Arthur Samuel Allen | Henri Dentz |

The Battle of Damour (5–9 July 1941) was the final major operation of the Australian forces during the Syria-Lebanon Campaign of World War II.

== Background ==
In 1941, Damour was the French administrative capital. Damour is a large town on the coast of Lebanon and is approximately 30 kilometres south of Beirut.

The Wadi Damour, with the Damour River in its bed, was a further three kilometres to the south of the town. These features were the last major natural obstacles that had to be crossed prior to reaching Beirut. Having already captured the heights overlooking Damour on the south bank of the wadi, the plan developed by Major General Arthur "Tubby" Allen, commanding the 7th Australian Division, involved encircling the Vichy French positions at Damour.

== Battle ==
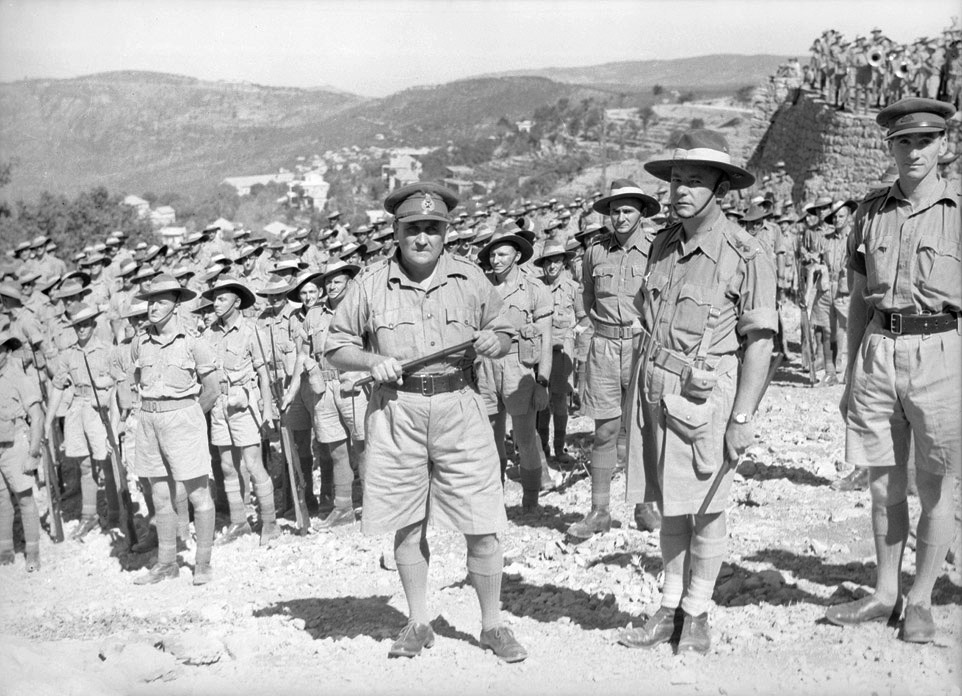
Hammana, Lebanon. September 2, 1941. Maj. Gen. A. S. "Tubby" Allen (centre), commander of the 7th Division, with Lt Col. Murray Moten (centre right), commander of the 2/27th Infantry Battalion and his men. (Photographer: Frank Hurley.)

On the night of 5 July 1941, the operation began with troops of the 21st Brigade moving into position to cross the Damour River in two places.

Early on 6 July, the Australians attacked Vichy French positions on the northern side. The 2/16th Battalion attacked at El Atiqa. The 2/27th Battalion attacked at El Boum. By nightfall, both positions were in Australian hands.

In the early hours of 7 July, the 2/3rd Battalion and the 2/5th Battalion, along with two companies of the 2/14th Battalion, moved northwards through El Boum. They outflanked Damour to the east. At Daraya, the 2/14th companies swung west to advance on Damour from the east, while the 2/3rd Battalion and the 2/5th Battalion continued north to cut the road to Beirut north of the town.

On 8 July, the Australians accomplished cutting the road. In the south, the 2/2nd Pioneer Battalion and elements of the 6th Divisional Cavalry Regiment were advancing along the axis of the coastal road.

By 2 am on 9 July, the Pioneers were advancing into the southern outskirts of the town. At 4 am a patrol from the cavalry were able to drive right through Damour. The remaining Vichy French forces had managed to slip out of the Australian encirclement and had withdrawn from Damour. The Australians immediately began pushing along the coastal road towards Beirut.

== Aftermath ==
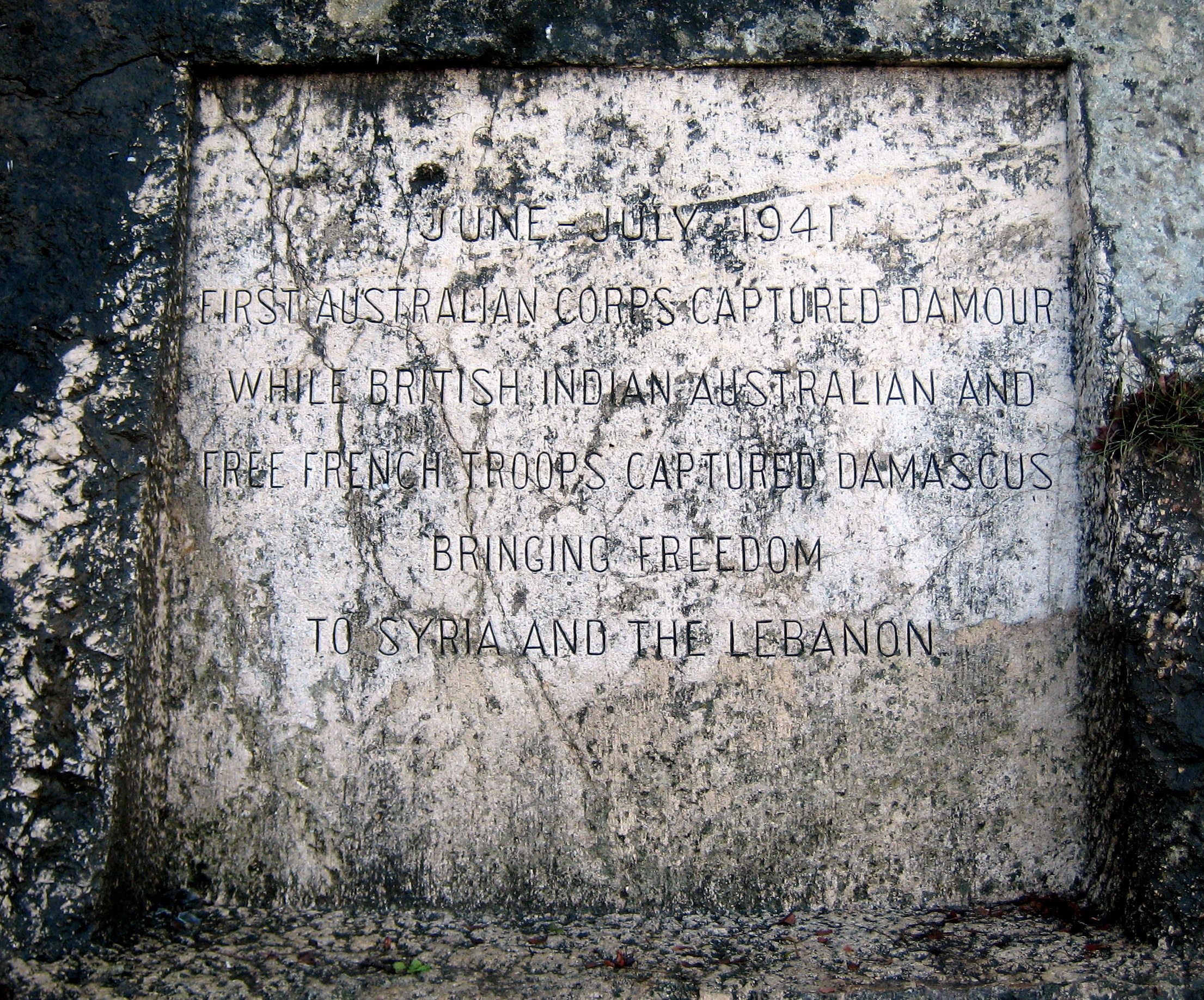
Commemorative plate for the seizure of Damour by the Australians in 1941, installed in Nahr el Kaleb to the north of Beirut.

After the Battle of Damour, the fate of Beirut was sealed.

On 8 July, even before the fall of Damour, the Vichy French commander, General Henri Dentz, had sought an armistice. At one minute past midnight on 12 July a ceasefire came into effect. For all intents and purposes, this ended the campaign.

== See also ==
- Arthur Roden Cutler

== Sources ==
- Long, Gavin (1953). "Chapters 24 ("Preparing a Final Blow") & 25 ("The Battle of Damour")". Greece, Crete and Syria (1st edition, 1953). Australia in the War of 1939–1945. Series 1 – Army. Vol. II. Canberra: Australian War Memorial.
