= Shared information bias =

Shared information bias (also known as the collective information sampling bias, or common-information bias) is known as the tendency for group members to spend more time and energy discussing information that all members are already familiar with (i.e., shared information), and less time and energy discussing information that only some members are aware of (i.e., unshared information). Harmful consequences related to poor decision-making can arise when the group does not have access to unshared information (hidden profiles) in order to make a well-informed decision.

== Causes ==
Although discussing unshared information may be enlightening, groups are often motivated to discuss shared information in order to reach group consensus on some course of action. According to Postmes, Spears, and Cihangir (2001), when group members are motivated by a desire to reach closure (e.g., a desire imposed by time constraints), their bias for discussing shared information is stronger. However, if members are concerned with making the best decision possible, this bias becomes less salient. In support of the observations by Postmes et al. (2001), Stewart and Stasser (1998) have asserted that the shared information bias is strongest for group members working on ambiguous, judgment-oriented tasks because their goal is to reach consensual agreement than to distinguish a correct solution.

The shared information bias may also develop during group discussion in response to the interpersonal and psychological needs of individual group members. For example, some group members tend to seek group support for their own personal opinions. This psychological motivation to garner collective acceptance of one's own initial views has been linked to group preferences for shared information during decision-making activities (Greitemeyer & Schulz-Hardt, 2003; Henningsen & Henningsen, 2003)

At the same time, when acting together with others toward a joint goal, representing a co-actor’s task can be beneficial as it enables agents to predict others’ actions and to integrate them into their own action plan. For example, knowledge about a co-actor’s task can be useful if access to online perceptual information about the co-actor’s action is unavailable such that monitoring the co-actor’s unfolding action and continuously adjusting in an appropriate manner is not possible. This was shown in a study where dyads coordinated forward jumps of different distances such that they would land at the same time .

Lastly, the nature of the discussion between group members reflects whether biases for shared information will surface. According to Wittenbaum et al., 2004), members are motivated to establish and maintain reputations, to secure tighter bonds, and to compete for success against other group members. As a result, individuals tend to be selective when disclosing information to other group members.

== Avoidance strategies ==
Several strategies can be employed to reduce group focus on discussing shared information:

- Make effort to spend more time actively discussing collective decisions. Given that group members tend to discuss shared information first, longer meetings increase likelihood of reviewing unshared information as well.
- Make effort to avoid generalized discussions by increasing the diversity of opinions within the group (Smith, 2008).
- Introduce the discussion of a new topic to avoid returning to previously discussed items among members (Reimer, Reimer, & Hinsz, 2010).
- Avoid time pressure or time constraints that motivate group members to discuss less information (Kelly & Karau, 1999; Bowman & Wittenbaum, 2012).
- Clarify to group members when certain individuals have relevant expertise (Stewart & Stasser, 1995).
- Include more group members who have task-relevant experience (Wittenbaum, 1998).
- Technology (e.g., group decision support systems, GDSS) can also offer group members a way to catalog information that must be discussed. These technological tools (e.g., search engines, databases, computer programs that estimate risk) help facilitate communication between members while structuralizing the group's decision-making process (Hollingshead, 2001).

== See also ==
- Group decision-making
