= Women Who Golf =

Online sport community

Women Who Golf (WWG) is an online community which provides support to increase women's participation in golf.

== History ==
Women Who Golf was founded in June 2019 by an Australian golfer, Tuscany Williams, to connect female golfers. Williams drew on her own experience of often having to play with older golfers due to a lack of peers her age. By the COVID-19 pandemic, its membership grew to include participants sharing experiences, advice, and golf-related resources.

By 2024, it had expanded to Australia, Canada, the United Kingdom, and the United States.

== Community ==
Women Who Golf is an online community where women exchange experiences, advice, and information.

Discussions within the community range from logistical concerns like finding local playing partners and questioning traditional "ladies' tees," to more personal issues such as managing relationships within the sport.
