= Crop simulation model =

Method of estimating crop growth based on environmental factors

A Crop Simulation Model (CSM) is a simulation model that describes processes of crop growth and development as a function of weather conditions, soil conditions, and crop management. Typically, such models estimate times that specific growth stages are attained, biomass of crop components (e.g., leaves, stems, roots and harvestable products) as they change over time, and similarly, changes in soil moisture and nutrient status.

They are dynamic models that attempt to use fundamental mechanisms of plant and soil processes to simulate crop growth and development. The algorithms used vary in detail, but most have a time step of one day.

== Commonly used crop simulation models ==
- CropSyst, a multi-year multi-crop daily time-step crop simulation model developed by a team at Washington State University's Department of Biological Systems Engineering.
- DSSAT, the Decision Support System for Agro-technology Transfer, is a multi-crop, multi-year crop simulation model which evolved from the IBSNAT (1982-1993) and ICASA (1994-2003) collaboration projects.

== See also ==
- Crop yield
