= Differentiation (linguistics) =

Phenomenon studied in semantics

Differentiation in semantics is defined by Löbner (2002) as a meaning shift reached by "adding concepts to the original concepts". His example is James Joyce is hard to understand, where understand is differentiated from "perceiving the meaning" to "interpret the text meaning".

A related meaning shift is metonymy, where one builds a new concept out of an element of the original concept. In the example mentioned, James Joyce most likely refers to "the work of James Joyce" and not to the author – a metonymical shift. If the name were to refer to the man, understand would be differently differentiated, perhaps one would read it as "interpret the speech articulation" or "comprehend the actions" of the person James Joyce.

Meaning shifts are very common among language users, and allow for great flexibility of word usage. It is not to be confused with lexical ambiguity though, words as uttered in a context may have perfectly precise meanings even though in varying contexts they may be used to express widely different meanings.

== See also ==
- Metaphor
