= Spatial decision support system =

Computerised aid to land use decisions

A spatial decision support system (SDSS) is an interactive, computer-based system designed to assist in decision making while solving a semi-structured spatial problem. It is designed to assist the spatial planner with guidance in making land use decisions. A system which models decisions could be used to help identify the most effective decision path.

An SDSS is sometimes referred to as a policy support system, and comprises a decision support system (DSS) and a geographic information system (GIS). This entails use of a database management system (DBMS), which holds and handles the geographical data; a library of potential models that can be used to forecast the possible outcomes of decisions; and an interface to aid the users interaction with the computer system and to assist in analysis of outcomes.

== Process ==
An SDSS usually exists in the form of a computer model or collection of interlinked computer models, including a land use model. Although various techniques are available to simulate land use dynamics, two types are particularly suitable for SDSS. These are cellular automata (CA) based models and Agent based models (ABM).

An SDSS typically uses a variety of spatial and nonspatial information, like data on land use, transportation, water management, demographics, agriculture, climate, epidemiology, resource management or employment. By using two or more known points in history the models can be calibrated and then projections into the future can be made to analyze different spatial policy options. Using these techniques spatial planners can investigate the effects of different scenarios, and provide information to make informed decisions. To allow the user to easily adapt the system to deal with possible intervention possibilities an interface allows for simple modification to be made.
