= The Right Question Institute =

American nonprofit organization

The Right Question Institute (RQI) is a nonprofit educational organization based in Cambridge, Massachusetts. It is known for developing and sharing teaching methods and skill improvement techniques that focus on questioning, inquiry, self-advocacy, parent involvement, and citizen participation in democracy. It collaborates with organizations in areas such as primary, secondary, and higher education, voter engagement, health care, legal services, and social services to build people's skills for learning, engagement, advocacy, navigating systems, and taking action on their own behalf. RQI's methods are used in classroom settings to encourage student curiosity and questioning. RQI's stated motto is, "A Catalyst for Microdemocracy", which RQI describes as "the idea that ordinary encounters with public agencies are opportunities for individual citizens to ‘act democratically’ and participate effectively in decisions that affect them".

== History ==
The origins of the organization stem from a dropout prevention program, funded by the Annie E. Casey Foundation, in Lawrence, Massachusetts, in 1990. During this effort parents reported they struggled to get involved in their children's education because they didn't know what questions to ask. In its early days the organization was known as "the Right Question Project". The Right Question Institute was co-founded by Dan Rothstein and Luz Santana, who served as directors of the organization until May 2021. In May 2021, former EqualityMaine director Betsy Smith joined the Right Question Institute as executive director.

During the 1990s the organization was mostly involved in conducting workshops and seminars for improving parent involvement in schools. Additionally, it also was involved in adult education, community organizing, and voter engagement. During this time, the institute coined and started to use the phrase Microdemocracy as a tool for shared decision-making and democratic action. Post 2000, the organization commenced activities in field of mental health. In 2017, The Right Question Institute received a grant from the National Science Foundation, through Brandeis University, for developing "the Question Improvement Model" to improve question formulation skills among students pursuing doctorates. In 2019, The Right question Institute received a grant from the National Science Foundation through Northeastern University for organizing a Conference on Question Formulation Technique in Higher Education. In the same year, the organization also received a grant from the Library of Congress Teaching with Primary Sources (TPS) program for implementation of "digitized primary sources in K-12 classrooms". In late 2019, the institute initiated the "Why Vote" campaign, an initiative to spread awareness about the necessity to participate in the electoral practice. In 2021, the institute collaborated with National Geographic to introduce a course to explore "Geo-Inquiry Questions" as part of National Geographic's Geo-Inquiry Learning Process. In 2022, the Right Question Institute, in partnership with Northeastern University, received grant funding from the National Science Foundation "to increase the ability of academic researchers to formulate research questions and ideas with potentially transformative outcomes."

== Question Formulation Technique ==
The Question Formulation Technique (QFT) is a method developed by the Right Question Institute that allows and enables a person, typically a student, to ask questions while engaged in a learning process. RQI's co-founders, Dan Rothstein and Luz Santana, introduced educators to this method in a 2011 book, Make Just One Change: Teach Students to Ask Their Own Questions, published by Harvard Education Press. As of late 2022, the book was fourth on the list of "top 10" bestselling titles in the history of Harvard Education Press. In April 2018, the EBSCO Information Services reported that the Question Formulation Technique has been used by more than 250,000 instructors and educators across diverse disciplines in different educational systems. The model is described as a student-centric approach, rather than the traditional instructor-centric model, where students are encouraged to form questions, categorize them, improve them, use them, and reflect on the experience. The QFT is used by educators across all academic subject areas. Educators often use the QFT in connection to primary source learning, where the instructors select a suitable primary source and present it to students to aid them in formulating relevant questions. In this way, students, guided by the practice of question formulation, learn about the subject.

The Right Question Institute, in collaboration with The Harvard Graduate School of Education, conducts a course in best practices in Question Formulation Technique.

== Voice in Decisions Technique ==
The Voice in Decisions Technique (VIDT), formerly known as the Framework for Accountable Decision-Making (FADM), is a strategy or method which is used to make someone conscious about the decision-making process. It aims to make a person more effective by providing a method for actively participating in the decision-making process and identifying their roles in the decision-making process. A major practical application of this strategy has been in building more effective relationships between schools and parents/guardians, where schools enable parents/guardians to become more involved in decisions around their kids’ education. The model has also been applied in community health centers and in the domain of mental health, where the model is used to aid and assist patient activation to boost patients’ attendance and retention.

== Selected publications ==
- Santana, Luz., Rothstein, Dan. Make Just One Change: Teach Students to Ask Their Own Questions. United Kingdom: Harvard Education Press, 2011.
- Rothstein, Dan., Bain, Agnes., Santana, Luz. Partnering with Parents to Ask the Right Questions: A Powerful Strategy for Strengthening School-family Partnerships. United States: ASCD, 2016.
- Luz Santana, A Pathway out of Poverty for Students in Low-Income Communities: Learning to Ask Questions, Harvard Education Publishing Group.
- Santana, Luz., Rothstein, Dan., Teaching Students to Ask Their Own Questions, Harvard Education Letter - Harvard Education Publishing Group
- Campbell, N., & Santana, L. (2021). Building Self-Advocacy Skills of Legal Services Clients: Three Principles for Promoting an Innovation in Practice. Social Innovations Journal, 5.
