= Advice (opinion) =

Providing recommendations or guidance

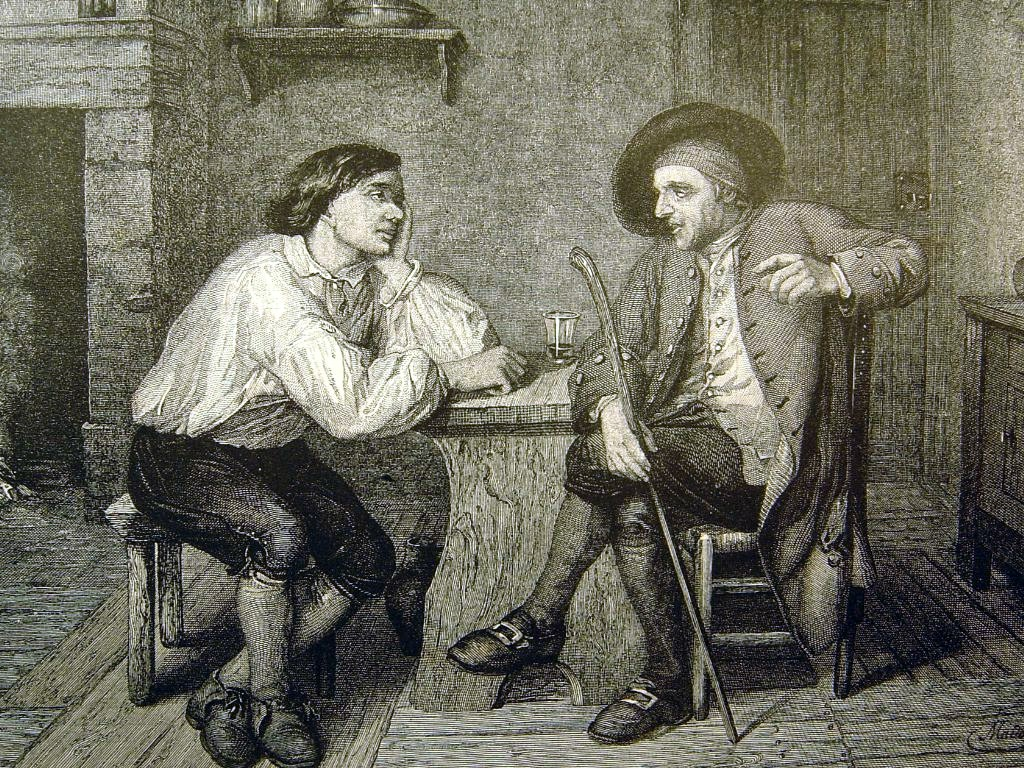
The Good Advice (original title: Le bon conseil), by Jean-Baptiste Madou.

Advice (also called exhortation) is a form of relating personal or institutional opinions, belief systems, values, recommendations or guidance about certain situations relayed in some context to another person, group or party. Advice is often offered as a guide to action and/or conduct. Simply, an advice message is advice about what might be thought, said, or otherwise done to address a problem, make a decision, or manage a situation.

== Advice-giving and advice-taking in the social sciences ==
=== Background information ===
Advice-taking and advice-giving are of interest to researchers in the disciplines of psychology, economics, judgment and decision-making, organizational behavior and human resources, and human communication, among others.

In psychology, seminal articles include Brehmer and Hagafors (1986), Hollenbeck et al. (1995), and Sniezek and Buckley (1995). The Sniezek and Buckley (1995) and Hollenbeck et al. (1995) articles, in particular, introduced researchers to standardized ways of studying advice in the laboratory. The psychological literature on advice-giving and advice-taking was reviewed by Bonaccio and Dalal (2006), and a portion of this literature was also reviewed by Humphrey et al. (2002).

Communication researchers have tended to study advice as part of their research on supportive communication. Much research has focused on gender differences (and similarities) in the provision and receipt of supportive communication.

In economics, the willingness of entrepreneurs to take advice from early investors and other partners (i.e., entrepreneurial coachability) has long been considered a critical factor in entrepreneurial success. At the same time, some economists have argued that entrepreneurs should not simply act on all advice given to them, even when that advice comes from well-informed sources, because the entrepreneurs themselves possess far deeper and richer local knowledge about their own firm than any outsider. Indeed, measures of advice-taking are not actually predictive of subsequent entrepreneurial success (e.g., measured as success in subsequent funding rounds, acquisitions, pivots, and firm survival).

=== Social science definitions of "advice" ===
In the social sciences in general, and in psychological research in particular, advice has typically been defined as a recommendation to do something. For example, in response to a client's question regarding whether to invest in stocks, bonds, or T-notes, a financial planner (the advisor) might say: "I recommend going with bonds at this time." However, Dalal and Bonaccio (2010) have argued, based on a review of the research literature, that such a definition is incomplete and leaves out several important types of advice These authors have provided the following taxonomy of advice:

- Recommending a particular course of action (this is the usual form of advice that is studied)
- Recommending against a particular course of action
- Providing additional information about a particular course of action without explicitly prescribing or proscribing that course of action
- Recommending how to go about making the decision (here, too, no courses of action are explicitly prescribed or proscribed)

Of these four types of advice (and socio-emotional support, which is a related form of interpersonal assistance that often accompanies advice), Dalal and Bonaccio (2010) found that decision-makers reacted most favorably to the provision of information, because this form of advice not only increased decision accuracy but also allowed the decision-maker to maintain autonomy.

== Methodological advice ==
Methodological advice concerns expert advice on research methodology. This kind of advice is, as opposed to some forms of advising mentioned above, usually initiated by the person who receives the advice, thus not unrequested. The goal of the advisor (see statistical consultant) is to guarantee the quality of research undertaken by their client, a researcher, by providing sound methodological advice. The advice may take different forms. In some cases the advisor collaborates with a researcher in a more long-term process, and guides them through the more technical parts of the research (this type of advising is called longitudinal consultancy). In complex, longterm projects it is not uncommon for the advisor to help by doing part of the work themself (interactive consultancy). In other cases a researcher may have a specific question that can be answered in a brief conversation with a consultant (cross-sectional consultancy, or advisory consulting). The advisors role can also take a didactic form, when the client is not familiar with suggested (statistical) methods. Sometimes the best advice is not statistically ideal, but is comprehensible for the client.

Depending on the function of the methodological advisor, the advice that is given may not be free. If a student conducts research commissioned by a professor, this professor will probably help this student for free, if needed. However, if a researcher contacts an independent advisor, this probably costs them. In this case the methodological advisor is basically being hired by the researcher. In other cases the advisor may be incorporated into research team, leading to co-authorship. It is advisable to make clear agreements about the advisors compensation on fore hand.

Researchers may seek advice on a wide range of subjects concerning their research. One of the major tasks of the methodological advisor is to help their clients think about what they really want to accomplish. This may involve helping them to formulate the research question and relatedly, the research hypothesis (see scientific hypothesis). Clients may also seek advice on the construction of a measurement instrument (for instance a psychological test). Or, they may want to know how to implement an appropriate research design. Often questions arise on how to analyze the data (see data analysis), and how to interpret and report the results (see scientific publishing).

A researcher will usually know more about the field in which the study is conducted than the methodological advisor. The advisor on the other hand will know more about the method. By combining their expertise and, through dialog and cooperation, researcher and consultant may achieve better, more reliable results.

== See also ==
- Advice column
- Astrologer
- Business consultation
- Judge–advisor system
- Protrepsis and paraenesis
- Public consultation
- Salat al-Istikharah
- Category:Family and parenting writers
