= Damour River =

River in Lebanon

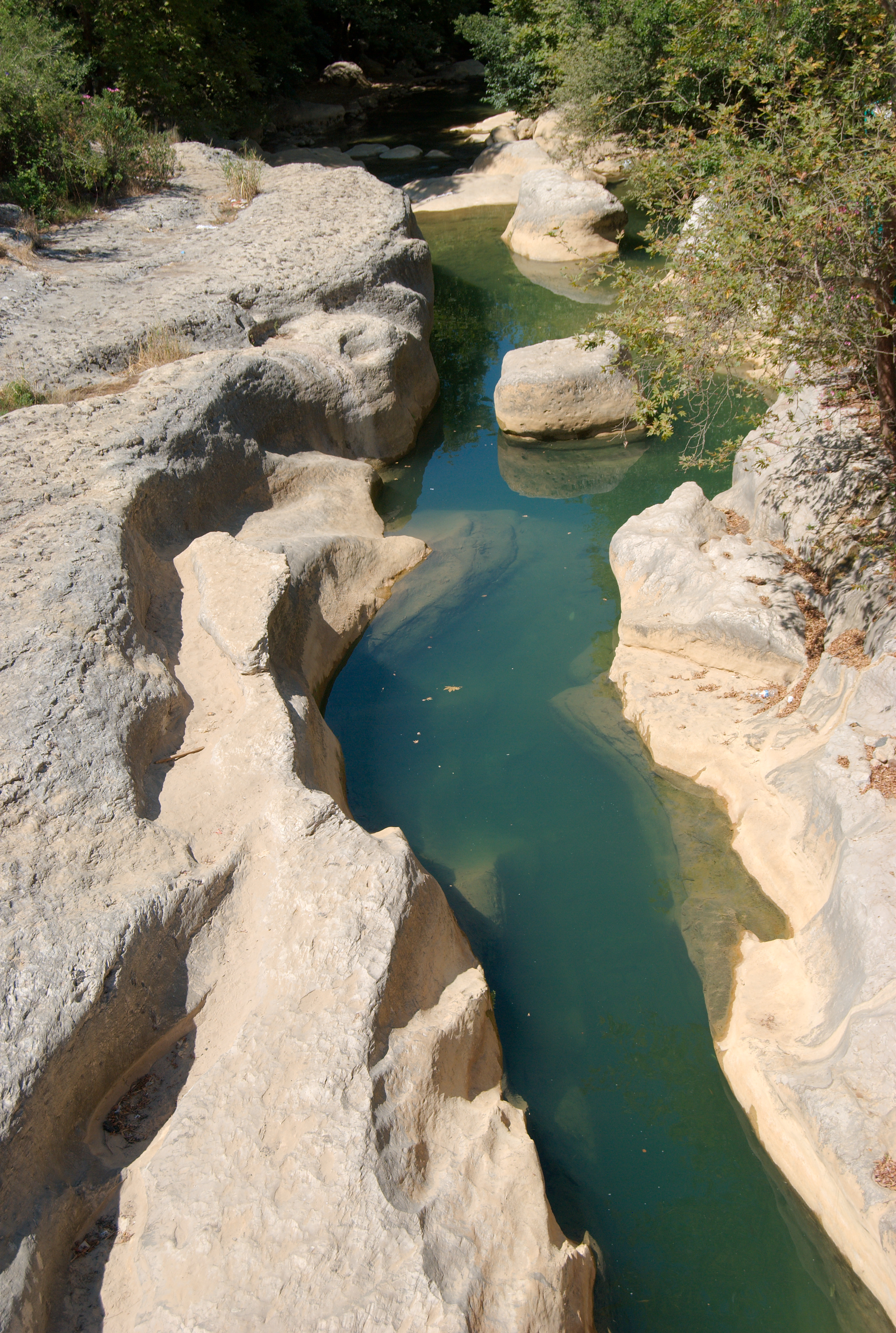
- The Damour river at Jisr el Qadi

Location
- Country: Lebanon

Physical characteristics
- Source
  - location: Nabaa Al Safa, Nabeh Al Barouk
  - elevation: 1,950 m (6,400 ft)
- Mouth
  - location: Mediterranean Sea
  - coordinates: 33°42′21″N 35°26′22″E
- Length: 37.5 km (23.3 mi)
- Discharge
  - average: 307,000 m^{3}/a (0.344 cu ft/s)

The Damour River (Arabic: نهر الدامور, romanized: Nahr ad-Dāmūr) is a 37.5-kilometre (23.3 mi) coastal river in the Mount Lebanon Governorate in Lebanon. The river's headwaters originate on and around the slopes of the 1,943-meter peak Jabal el-Barouk, site of a nature preserve where some of Lebanon's largest and oldest Cedars of Lebanon are found, and flows west through the Jisr Al-Kadi valley, where it receives water from the creeks of the Chouf mountains. The river flows towards the Mediterranean Sea, south of Damour, which bears the river's name.

== Mythology ==
During the Phoenician time, Canaanite people being affected by drought seasons, called the river "Damoros" ancient Tamyrus, in the attribution of 'Damoros' god of immortality, related to 'Achtarout', god of love and beauty.

== The city foundation ==
The city was founded on the river's edge by poor people who wanted to charge the right of way to the emirs.
