= Intelligent decision support system =

An intelligent decision support system (IDSS) is a decision support system that makes extensive use of artificial intelligence (AI) techniques. Use of AI techniques in management information systems has a long history – indeed terms such as "Knowledge-based systems" (KBS) and "intelligent systems" have been used since the early 1980s to describe components of management systems, but the term "Intelligent decision support system" is thought to originate with Clyde Holsapple and Andrew Whinston in the late 1970s. Examples of specialized intelligent decision support systems include Flexible manufacturing systems (FMS), intelligent marketing decision support systems and medical diagnosis systems.

Ideally, an intelligent decision support system should behave like a human consultant: supporting decision makers by gathering and analysing evidence, identifying and diagnosing problems, proposing possible courses of action and evaluating such proposed actions. The aim of the AI techniques embedded in an intelligent decision support system is to enable these tasks to be performed by a computer, while emulating human capabilities as closely as possible.

Many IDSS implementations are based on expert systems, a well established type of KBS that encode knowledge and emulate the cognitive behaviours of human experts using predicate logic rules, and have been shown to perform better than the original human experts in some circumstances. Expert systems emerged as practical applications in the 1980s based on research in artificial intelligence performed during the late 1960s and early 1970s. They typically combine knowledge of a particular application domain with an inference capability to enable the system to propose decisions or diagnoses. Accuracy and consistency can be comparable to (or even exceed) that of human experts when the decision parameters are well known (e.g. if a common disease is being diagnosed), but performance can be poor when novel or uncertain circumstances arise.

Research in AI focused on enabling systems to respond to novelty and uncertainty in more flexible ways is starting to be used in IDSS. For example, intelligent agents that perform complex cognitive tasks without any need for human intervention have been used in a range of decision support applications. Capabilities of these intelligent agents include knowledge sharing, machine learning, data mining, and automated inference. A range of AI techniques such as case based reasoning, rough sets and fuzzy logic have also been used to enable decision support systems to perform better in uncertain conditions.

A 2009 research about a multi-artificial system intelligence system named IILS is proposed to automate problem-solving processes within the logistics industry. The system involves integrating intelligence modules based on case-based reasoning, multi-agent systems, fuzzy logic, and artificial neural networks aiming to offer advanced logistics solutions and support in making well-informed, high-quality decisions to address a wide range of customer needs and challenges.
