= Indxx =

Financial services company

Indxx, Inc.
- Company type: Private company
- Industry: Financial services
- Founded: 2005
- Headquarters: Miami
- Key people: PK Sen Sharma; Founder& Managing Partner; Naveen Kumar; Co-founder&Managing Partner; Rahul Sen Sharma, Managing Partner
- Services: Benchmark Indexes; Custom Index Development; Index Calculation; Equity Basket Calculation; Portfolio Analysis

Indxx, Inc. is a global diversified financial services firm. Founded in 2005 by Mexx Co-founder PK Sen Sharma, the company has offices in New Delhi, India; New York, USA; Miami, USA and Prague, Czech Republic. It currently has over 100 employees spread across four main business groups: Indxx Indices, Custom Indices, Client Indices and Equity Basket Calculation.

The firm specializes in the development and publishing of proprietary custom indices, which are licensed to financial intermediaries worldwide. Indxx indices are currently used as benchmarks for exchange-traded funds, SMAs, and other financial products.

== Main Business Groups ==
- Indxx Indices: Unique index concepts developed fully in-house, by Indxx, and offered for license for passive products. Recent examples of this include the Indxx Blockchain Index, and Indxx Disruptive Technologies Index.
- Custom Indices: Indices built, upon request, for the exclusive use of a client by Indxx’s index development team. Recent examples of this include the Indxx Global Robotics & Artificial Intelligence Thematic Index and Indxx Artificial Intelligence & Big Data Index.
- Client Indices: In contrast to the Indxx Indices or Custom Indices services, where index development is driven by Indxx, the Client Indices service is for clients who know the exact methodology they want. Indxx’s team then codes, builds and backtests the index based on the client’s instructions. Common coding languages utilized include Python, MATLAB, and others.
- Equity Basket Calculation: Best utilized by clients who seek to run their own equity index methodologies and simply provide Indxx with the index names and weights.

== History ==
Indxx started its operations in 2005, and was initially engaged in the development of indices that served as internal benchmarks for existing investment funds. Indxx entered the ETF market in 2009 and the first two ETFs based on Indxx indices were launched on NYSE in 2010; this number reached 16 in March 2016, with many additional products being prepared for launch. This number exceeded 90 products as of December, 2020.

- 2010: First two ETFs tracking Indxx indices launched on the NYSE.
- 2013: Launched 3rd party index back testing, administration and calculation services.
- 2017: Total assets under management of exchange traded products tracking Indxx indices crossed $1 billion. Indxx expanded its geographical presence and had the first ETF tracking one of its indices launched in the Middle East.
- 2018: Indxx entered new markets by launching products in Europe, Canada, and Australia.
- 2019: Total assets under management of exchange traded products tracking Indxx indices exceeds $5 billion.
- 2020: Launched the ESG Index Series and Benchmark Index Series. Total assets under management of exchange traded products tracking Indxx indices exceeds $10 billion.

As of March 2022, indices which were developed by Indxx were tied to various financial products and tracked assets of over $22 billion.
