= CropSyst =

Agriculture simulation model

CropSyst is a multi-year multi-crop daily time-step crop simulation model being developed by a team at Washington State University's Department of Biological Systems Engineering. The model is used to study the effect of cropping systems management on productivity (budgeting).

The model has been parameterised for a wide range of crops such as potatoes, lentils, tea and grapes. Management options include rotations, irrigation, fertilization and tillage. It is widely used within research projects around the world including the United States, Italy and the United Kingdom (e.g. Land Allocation Decision Support System).

== See also ==
- Agrometeorology
- Biological engineering
- Crop yield

== Resources ==
Peer reviewed papers and applications of CropSyst can be found at:

- SIPEAA
- LADSS-CropSyst
