= Judge–advisor system =

A judge–advisor system (JAS) is a type of advice structure often studied in advice taking research, a subset of decision-making in the social sciences. The two roles in a JAS are the judge and advisor roles. The judge is the decision maker who evaluates information concerning a particular decision and makes the final judgment on the decision outcome. The advisor is an individual who provides advice, information, or suggestions to the judge. A key component of the dynamics in a JAS is the differentiation between the two roles in that while the advisor provides input to the decision, the ultimate decision-making authority resides solely with the judge. This one person decision power differentiates the JAS and related models such as Hollenbeck's Hierarchical Decision-Making Team model from more widely studied models where the final decision is mutually decided upon by the team as a whole.

While JASs can be easily thought of as between superiors and subordinates, differential social or power standings are not necessary. All that is required is that only one individual (the judge) has the final say in the decision outcome; all other input given to the judge may be taken under consideration but need not be acted on. Therefore, even a situation where a friend receives advice from a peer can be considered a JAS.

Though examples of JASs are prevalent in real-world settings, they are studied most frequently in laboratory experiments in which judge/advisor roles are randomly assigned and situations/variables are manipulated at a between-subjects level. Such manipulations allow for a systematic study of the factors that affect how a judge reacts and responds to advisor advice.

== Advice utilization and advice discounting ==
Advice utilization is the degree to which judges take advisor advice into consideration in their final decision outcome, and advice discounting is any effect that lowers the degree of advice utilization. Both of these terms are frequently used interchangeably in JAS literature, as they are related in opposition to one another (i.e., advice discounting is a lack of advice utilization). The amount of utilization is one of the most considered outcomes of a JAS decision process and depends on all the types of inputs described below. In addition to these inputs, there are theories for other sources of advice discounting in decision-making literature; three of the most dominant theories are differential information, anchoring, and egocentric bias.

- The differential information theory proposes that advice discounting stems from the fact that, unlike with people's own opinions, they are not aware of advisors' internal reasons for their opinions and so are less apt to fully accept them.
- The second theory, anchoring, suggests that people use their own opinion as to the starting point for their choice, and only use advisor input to a certain extent that will adjust their initial position up or down.
- The third theory, egocentric bias, proposes advice discounting happens due to judges believing they are superior to others, so weigh their own opinion stronger than inputs from any other source.

In JAS literature, one of the most robust advice discounting classification is egocentric advice discounting, which draws conceptually from the basic theories of anchoring and egocentric bias. Simply put, egocentric advice discounting is the tendency of individuals to prefer advice and opinions that closely align to their own opinions formed prior to hearing any input. Therefore, judges tend to overly weigh advice from advisors that is similar to their own viewpoint regardless of what sort of expertise an advisor appears to have. Conversely, if the advice given is very dissimilar to the judge's initial opinions, that advice will be discounted much more than should be justified given the advisor's level of expertise.

== Antecedents to advice utilization ==
=== Judge decision-making style ===
Decision-making style refers to differences in the ways individuals approach decision tasks and respond to situations. In a JAS, judges' differing styles can affect the way they accept and respond to advisor advice. Five styles identified by Scott and Bruce (1995) are rational, intuitive, dependent, spontaneous and avoidant.

- Rational: relying on logical evaluations and exhaustive searches for all relevant information
- Intuitive: relying on intuition, hunches, and other intangibles
- Dependent: relying on others for advice and direction
- Spontaneous: relying on a strong urge to make decisions as soon as possible
- Avoidant: relying on strategies for putting off the decision-making process as long as possible

These styles are not mutually exclusive within an individual, but there are discernible pattern differences across people. While not explicitly examined in many JAS studies, an understanding of these decision-making style differences can inform future understanding of advice-taking dynamics.

=== Decision-making competence ===
Judges may differ in their susceptibility to a number of different errors in decision-making; these characteristic differences are considered their specific decision-making competencies. While decision-making competency has been broken down into categories in several different ways, one of the most widely accepted frameworks is the Adult Decision-Making Competence scale (A-DMC), developed by Bruine de Bruin et al. The A-DMC consists of 7 categories of decision-making competencies that include dimensions such as Resistance to Framing and Recognizing Social Norms (see Bruine de Bruin et al., 2007, for a full description). Weaknesses in these different areas make judges more susceptible to particular errors in judgment and may influence the way advisor input is received and acted upon.

=== Trust and confidence ===
The level of trust a judge has with an advisor is directly related to the degree to which advice is taken into account. When judges trust their advisors, they are more likely to accept the advice given to them, all other factors being equal. Note that the trust relationship in a JAS is frequently unbalanced due to the greater importance of trust for the judge than the advisor. This results because the judge must place a certain amount of trust in the advisors in order to utilize their advice in the decision, which only the judge is ultimately responsible for. Advisors, on the other hand, typically need not trust a judge in order to simply relay a suggestion or information. Given this dynamic, considerations of trust levels need only be made from the judge's and not the advisor's perspective. Key influencers of JAS trust levels include perceived advisor confidence and subject expertise.

=== Type of advice ===
The type of advice given by an advisor can influence the way it is received by the judge. In a JAS, the concept of advice needs to be broader than the typical definition of a recommendation for a particular outcome in a decision situation. While this sort of input is certainly one kind of advice, other types of advice also exist. Dalal and Bonaccio (2010) suggest that there are 4 different kinds of advice:

- Recommendation for: advice in favor of a particular alternative
- Recommendation against: advice against one or more alternatives
- Information: neutral advice giving more information about the alternatives without suggesting a particular one
- Decision Support: no specific outcome advice; instead, input or support to guide the judge's decision-making process

Judges react to these four types of advice with differential preferences. While specifics of the particular type of decision task and the judge's individual differences can affect the degree of preference between types, initial research shows Information-type advice to be most preferred. This sort of advice has been little recognized in much of the past advice-taking literature and is expected to receive more attention in the future.

=== Task type ===
The difficulty of the decision task influences the extent judges rely on advisor inputs. When a difficult task is given to a judge, there is a tendency to over-rely on the advice received from advisors; conversely, judges tend to rely less than they should on advisor information when the task seems relatively easy. For example, if judges need to make a decision about which stocks will be best performers based on complex financial data they are given, they will be likely to defer to the advice of their advisors regardless of their supposed expertise since the judge's own grasp of the situation is so low. However, if the decision task seems more straightforward or simple to the judges, they will be far likelier to weigh their own opinions more heavily than their advisors' inputs regardless of the states of expertise the advisors have.

While the most often used decision tasks in JAS literature are ones that involve picking the "right" or "best" option, an entirely different kind of decision to consider is one involving a choice based on taste or preference. These situations come up frequently in life and are part of almost every consumer decision about the kind of music to buy, clothes to wear, or restaurants to visit. Though less explored in JAS literature, Yaniv et al. (2011) provided evidence that in these situations of preference, similarity of the advisor to the judge is the strongest predictor of how much the judge will accept the advice. This similarity can be either in regard to a previous history of the advisor having similar preferences in a given category (e.g., they rate the same kinds of songs highly) or relating to basic demographic characteristics (e.g., they are around the same age).

=== Solicitation of advice ===
Advice from an advisor can be either solicited (the judge seeks out input) or unsolicited (input is given automatically without being requested). The degree of advice utilization has been shown to be influenced by which of these two situations is true for the decision situation at hand. As may be expected by conventional wisdom, advice utilization is typically higher for solicited versus unsolicited advice. When people seek out advice, it is implied that they are open to considering opinions other than their own and prone to higher advice utilization. Conversely, unsolicited advice can be seen as intrusive or as a type of criticism from the advisor about the judge's competency.

=== Other factors contributing to advice utilization ===
==== Financial ====
Several characteristics of the decision task or judge–advisor relationship have been shown to decrease the effect of egocentric discounting. First, if there is a financial incentive for making the correct or best decision, judges tend to rely more heavily on their advisors. Similarly, when judges must pay for advice, that input is taken much more into account than when it is freely given. The effect of paying for advice is thought to have foundations in the economic theory of sunk costs.

==== Advisor characteristics ====
In situations where the judges perceive the advisors to have expert knowledge, the advice received is taken into account more, regardless of similarity to the judge's own opinions. This finding is intuitive: the less someone knows about a situation in relationship to their advisor, the more likely they are to take that person's advice into account. Advisor characteristics commonly associated with superior knowledge such as being older, more educated or more experienced also have been shown to decrease egocentric discounting in decision-making situations.

==== Task difficulty ====
Beyond advisor characteristics and financial factors, the nature of the decision task itself can influence the degree to which advice is accepted. In relatively easy tasks, judges tend to consider advisor input to a lesser degree than they should, based on the known expertise of the advisor. Similarly, when presented with a very difficult task, judges tend to over-rely on the advisor inputs. This dynamic is important to keep in mind when trying to identify real-world situations where people are vulnerable to being extremely influenced by people posing as "experts".

== Consequences of advice utilization ==
=== Accuracy of judge's final decision ===
Decision-making outcomes in a JAS (or other advice-giving structures) have been widely shown to be more accurate than those from situations with isolated decision makers. This result should be expected given that advice situations often allow judges access to knowledge above and beyond what they could have as an individual. When judges have access to multiple advisors with different information sources, their decision accuracy improves even more. A potential reason for this is due to the averaging across advisors that the judge does when integrating the different pieces of advice. Like in forecasting, the individual variations between advice become less pronounced, and judges are left with more definitive advice that has the strength of consensus behind it.

=== Judge's confidence in final decision ===
There are several key aspects of the JAS system that influence the degree to which the judge has confidence in his decision being accurate or correct. The amount of agreement between advisors has been shown to affect judges' confidence in their decision, such that higher disagreement between advisors is associated with low confidence. Another factor that has demonstrated influence over judge confidence is the amount of effort the judge must put forth to understand and react to the advice proffered by the advisors. As effort to process and comprehend advice increases, so does a judge's overall confidence in their final decision. Lastly, it was found that judges could actually become overconfident in their decisions when having to rely almost completely on advisor recommendations (due to not possessing nearly enough task-specific information themselves).

== Applications ==
Examples of judge–advisor systems can be found in many real-world situations. A recent example of an important JAS situation was that of the controversy around the federal loan guarantees to the now-bankrupt Solyndra. In this situation, as in many other situations that reach the presidential office, there are many sources of diverse advice that the president and other decision-makers receive. For example, both the director of the National Economic Council and the Treasury secretary advised the president that they believed the selection guidelines were not thorough enough and might allow for funding of unnecessary, risky companies. However, the Energy Secretary, under pressure from Congress, advised the president to actually speed up loans and decrease scrutiny on the selection process. As demonstrated by several studies, advisors with differing viewpoints and differing degrees of unique information can interact with decision-makers in complex and sometimes detrimental ways. The decision-makers are then in the difficult position of aggregating all this advice and making the most informed policy decision. As with the Solyndra controversy, these decisions can sometimes fall under great scrutiny and not produce the most effective solution.

JAS situations can also arise in more common settings that typical individuals can experience. A very common JAS arises when individuals receive advice from doctors and other medical professionals. For example, an individual with diabetes might receive specific advice about better controlling their blood sugar after a situation that required that they go to the hospital. That individual then may seek second opinions about that advice before coming to a decision regarding whether or not they will change their behavior to fit more with those recommendations. As is found in the JAS research, people often do not fully utilize doctors' recommendations, often to their own detriment.

In each of these situations, being able to figure out the way to make the advice system most efficient and productive has clear benefits. Understanding the most effective ways to give advice has great potential in training programs for advisors, mentors, and in management training as a whole. An example of such application is seen in the work by Wilkins et al. (1999) on the development of the Raven and CoRaven decision-making aids used by the military to filter and represent massive amounts of battlefield data for strategic planning. Using principles derived from JAS research, the authors were able to analyze and better understand the aids, with the result being a more effective system that makes battlefield decision-making less of a risky process. In this situation, the researchers treated the intelligent software as an advisor, and the commanding officer as the judge. Under this assumption, the researchers then applied past and current JAS research findings to critically evaluate the software with the hopes of improving its functionality. This utilization of JAS research is an example of one of the most promising and direct applications of the paradigm – collaborative technology, which can facilitate decision-making processes that are too complex for human cognition alone.

Judge advisor systems research can also be applied to business, finance, education, and many other fields in which hierarchical group-decision making is common. Applications of such research could be used to make time-sensitive decisions in high-impact situations such as emergency rooms more efficient and accurate, potentially saving the lives of patients in need. The JAS framework could be effectively applied in public affairs to increase the speed at which new policies are created and enacted. Other direct and indirect applications are possible for virtually every situation in which hierarchical group decision-making exists.

== Future research directions ==
JAS research is still a developing field with growth needed in a couple key areas. One area of interest is a deeper understanding about the motives of decision-makers in JAS situations beyond decision accuracy and autonomy. In the real world, decision-makers frequently have many motives beyond making the most accurate and informed decision, often due to social influences. Some additional motives that have already been cited include attempting to diffuse responsibility for a decision, minimizing the amount of effort on behalf of the decision-maker, and maintaining good rapport with the advisor(s).

As mentioned previously, a less-explored subject matter that has surfaced in the JAS literature pertains to decisions regarding matters of taste. Due to the relative newness of this work, there is ample opportunity for further research. New questions raised by this research include the effect of normative influences on taste preferences and hot-cold empathy gaps (i.e. individuals' preference for a certain food in a "not hungry" versus "hungry" state).

With the growing prevalence of machine learning systems, another emerging stream of JAS research focuses on unpacking contexts in which advice is provided by machine learning systems rather than human advisors, increasing the relevance of considering socio-technical factors in JAS scenarios.

Finally, one major topic that has been cited as needing further study is extending the context of decision-making beyond what has already been observed to see how these contexts affect the JAS. This research area is related to concerns about the generalizability of many JAS studies to real-world decision-making situations; in other words, that the stimuli in controlled lab settings are impoverished compared to the stimuli individuals experience in their own lives. Thus, there has been a call for research that replicates previous findings in a more "rich" situational context.

== See also ==
- Advice (opinion)
- Decision theory
- Decision-making
- Group decision making
- Individual differences psychology
- Industrial and organizational psychology
- Legal advisor
- Organizational psychology
- Social sciences
