= Cognitive assets =

Business jargon term

Cognitive assets are tangible and intangible organizational assets that constitute sources of the cognition that is necessary for action coordination. These assets allow for the integrity and efficiency of the multiple conversions of individual knowledge into organizational knowledge.

The idea of the cognitive assets was the first attempt to address the most relevant organizational assets to be exploited by cognition-driven businesses. The concept of cognitive assets is a reflection on the belief that it is sufficient the acquisition of software, such as for business intelligence or competitive intelligence to ensure that organizations make good decisions.

Organizational cognitive assets comprise four main dimensions: 1) the environmental mechanisms that foster the creation and sharing of explicit knowledge; 2) organizational members’ cognitive capacities; 3) organizational members´ transactional potential (defined as their ability to interact and share knowledge with co-workers); and 4) Analytics and computational methods used by the organization to support decision-making processes.

== History ==
The term was first used in a paper presented in 2002 at the Twelfth International Conference on Management of Technology organized by the International Association for Management of Technology (IAMOT) and published in a collection of the best papers of the conference. The paper refers to the ideas of a master's thesis presented in 2001 at Ibmec Business School, which was first used in this sense.

== Fundamentals of cognitive assets ==
Although most works assume that organizational knowledge exists and that it is more than simply the sum of individual knowledge, the important question of how it becomes “organizational” has not been addressed in much depth. Most authors refer to the work of Nonaka and his co-authors, which remains the sole comprehensive view on organizational knowledge formation.

Although the idea of “collective cognition” has been contested by researchers on the grounds that “cognition belongs to individuals, not organizations”, there is a growing number of studies in management that address this phenomenon at a group or organizational level. These studies concentrate on cognitive phenomena in and by organizations that impact the organization as a whole. Some conceptualizations stress that the field must embrace the complexities of the two levels (individual and group), which co-exist though interactive processes.

Cognition research in organizations has taken two main approaches: one computational and one interpretive. The computational stream examines the process by which managers and organizations process information and make decisions; the interpretive approach investigates how meaning is created around information in a social context.

The concept of cognitive assets takes both perspectives into account; individuals´ cognitive capacities and organizational decision-making systems are linked to the computational view, whereas the environment and transactional elements are linked to interpretive efforts. As defended by Lant, putting together these two perspectives will deepen our understanding of organizational cognition.

== Definition ==
Analogous to the process of individual knowledge creation, cognitive assets represent to organizations what cognition potential is to individuals. The process of new knowledge generation at the individual level can be seen as the systematic and efficient combination of the information available to the individual with her cognitive potential. Similarly, we can model organizational knowledge creation as the systematic and efficient combination of information-based assets with cognitive assets.

Organizational cognitive assets comprise four main dimensions: 1) the environmental mechanisms that foster the creation and sharing of explicit knowledge; 2) organizational members’ cognitive capacities; 3) organizational members´ transactional potential (defined as their ability to interact and share knowledge with co-workers); and 4) Analytics and computational methods used by the organization to support decision-making processes.

== Environment ==
The most basic dimension of cognitive assets is the environment where cognition takes place. Differently from cognitive studies done in psychology, where laboratory experiments are used to address issues of individual cognition, researchers of cognition in management have stressed the role of the environment where decisions and actions are being taken and the interactions of people within this environment. Knowledge is seen as a function of the social and physical system in which it exists.

The environment provides regulative (rules) and normative (values and norms) dimensions that govern organizational life. It sets the pre-conditions that allow for the transformation of individual knowledge into collective knowledge put into action. Following Orlikowski, five sets of activities are important in the organizational environment: (1) sharing identity; (2) interacting face to face; (3) aligning effort; (4) learning by doing; and (5) supporting participation. Managers can increase the effectiveness of knowledge conversions by stimulating these five sets of activities in the areas under their control.

== Individual cognitive capacity ==
The individual cognitive capacity of organizational members corresponds to their ability to process information efficiently and effectively to attain goals. That ability contributes to more and better conversions of information into collective knowledge.

Humans have a knowledge structure (or schema), which “represents organized knowledge about a given concept or type of stimulus”. This knowledge structure is a mental template that individuals impose on an information environment to give it form and meaning and to enable subsequent action. That way, it has strong influence on the process of transforming information into action.

The two most commonly studied attributes of knowledge structures are differentiation (the number of dimensions within a knowledge structure) and integration (the degree of interconnectedness among the knowledge structure dimensions). The higher the differentiation and integration, the more effective the knowledge structure is. Little differentiation leads to a narrow vision, which results in ineffective managerial behavior. Differentiation and integration are influenced by personality variables (level of aspiration, job involvement, cognitive complexity) and organizational experience (position in hierarchy, work experience).

== Transactional capacity ==
Transactional capacity is ability individuals have to absorb, codify and share information and explicit knowledge in order to meet organizational objectives. Transactional capacity will be a function of personal and structural dimensions. For personal characteristics, Eric Berne's transactional analysis in psychology studies three important dimensions: (1) learning; (2) rationality; and (3) emotions.

The structural dimension of transactional capacity is linked to the various networks within the organization. Social networks and the role of social capital have received an increasing attention in sociology studies over the past few years. There are two main approaches: one that follows the work of Coleman, which defends that social capital occurs in networks with closure, where the value of social capital resource is communication among members; another approach, deriving from Granovetter and Burt, defends that social capital occurs in networks without closure where the value of social capital resource is derived from brokering information and exercising control. The seemingly conflicting predictions of these two approaches may be due to the fact that each one has analyzed different environments. But regardless of the closure of social networks, the existence of a network and individuals willing to share information within it (and capture from outside it) is important. Dyer and Nobeoka, for example, defend that a highly interconnected network benefits all members by facilitating knowledge sharing and learning and increasing productivity of members.

== Decision-making support ==
Organizations use different tools and systems to help their decision-making processes. These tools and systems are broadly defined as any activity that, based on explicit (but not necessarily formalized) models, helps decision-making agents to obtain solutions to their problems given their preferences and the uncertainty of the environment. Together with individuals’ cognitive capacities, they define the organization's capacity to process information and make decisions.

Operations research, management science and decision science methods can be seen as analytical cognitive processes that help decision-making. These methods serve to increase the efficiency of the knowledge conversion and mobilization processes, increasing managers´ ability to process information and make decisions. That way, they are also important constituents of cognitive assets.
