= Legal advice =

Advice on legal issues for private or legal persons

Legal advice is the giving of a professional or formal opinion regarding the substance or procedure of the law in relation to a particular factual situation. The provision of legal advice will often involve analyzing a set of facts and advising a person to take a specific course of action based on the applicable law.

Legal advice is ordinarily provided in exchange for financial or other tangible compensation. Advice given without remuneration is normally referred to as being pro bono publico (in the public good), or simply pro bono.

In the common law systems, it is usually received from a solicitor, barrister or lawyer; in civil law systems it is given by advocates, lawyers, legal counsels, or other professionals (such as tax experts, professional advisors, etc.).

In some countries, legal advice is subject to the possession of a specific licence; in others, it is simply subject to the general regulation of professional obligation and can be provided by any person, who will usually be legally responsible for the provided advice. The UK's Legal Services Act 2007 includes the giving of legal advice within the definition of unreserved legal activities, which means that it can be provided by any person, not just an officer of the court. However, if it is provided by a lawyer or another person authorised by one of the front line legal services regulators, then this activity is included within their regulatory reach.

With the advent of the internet, many services have been established to provide individuals the power to conduct their own legal research or prepare their own legal documents.

== Legal information ==
Legal advice is distinguished from legal information which is the reiteration of legal fact. Legal information can be conveyed by a parking meter, a sign, or by other forms of notice such as a warning by a law enforcement officer.

Printed legal materials, such as directions and how-to manuals, are generally not considered legal advice. Accordingly, instructions on how to meet court requirements for the submission of forms and other court documents do not constitute legal advice. Thus, a non-lawyer may sell legal forms, provide general instructions for filling out the forms, and provide typing services for the entry of information into forms, provided no legal advice is given.

Basic instruction on how to complete a legal form, where to place information on the form, and the definition of legal terms used on a form constitute the provision of legal information. Instructing a person how to phrase information in a legal document or form, or advising the person as to what he or she should say in court, is the provision of legal advice. Similarly, application of legal rules and principles to a specific set of facts and advising a course of conduct is almost always held to constitute legal advice.

== See also ==
- Legal aid
- Legal awareness
- Judge–advisor system, an entity used by academic researchers to study the giving and taking of advice
