= DSSAT =

Computer program group

The Decision Support System for Agrotechnology Transfer (DSSAT) is a suite of computer programs designed to simulate agricultural crop growth. It has been used in more than 100 countries by agronomists to evaluate farming practices. One application has been assessing the possible impacts on agriculture of climate change and testing adaptation methods.

DSSAT is built with a modular approach, with different options available to represent such processes as evapotranspiration and soil organic matter accumulation, which facilitates testing different representations of processes important in crop growth. The functionality of DSSAT has also been extended through interfaces with other software such as GIS. DSSAT typically requires input parameters related to soil condition, weather, any management practices such as fertilizer use and irrigation, and characteristics of the crop variety being grown. Many common crops have their characteristics already implemented as DSSAT modules.

DSSAT grew out of the International Benchmark Sites Network for Agrotechnological Transfer (IBSNAT) in the 1980s, with the first official release in 1989. Version 4, released in 2003, introduced a more modular structure and added tools for agricultural economic analysis and risk assessment. Development has continued in affiliation with the International Consortium for Agricultural Systems Applications (ICASA).
