= Soil and Water Assessment Tool =

Soil and Water Assessment Tool (SWAT) is a free and open source hydrology model and GIS computer simulation sponsored by the USDA.

SWAT is a well known geographic hydrological model in use by many universities and government agencies around the world, and integrates with commercial products like ArcGIS.

== Some users of SWAT ==
- The River Systems Research Group of the Department of Oceanography at the University of Washington
- The Hydro and Agro Informatics Institute under the Ministry of Science and Technology of the Royal Thai Government
- The Departments of Agricultural & Biological Engineering and Civil & Environmental Engineering at Purdue University
