= World Forum for Democracy =

The World Forum for Democracy is a gathering each November in Strasbourg, France to debate the complex challenges facing democracies today and foster democratic innovation. The Forum is hosted by the Council of Europe and brings together members of civil society, political leaders and representatives of business, academia, media and professional groups. Past editions have revolved around themes such as "Bridging the gap: democracy between old models and new realities", "Re-wiring Democracy: connecting institutions and citizens in the digital age" and "From participation to influence: can youth revitalise democracy?".

The Forum's concept is that the challenges of 21st century democracy need to be addressed with 21st century means, using the power of networked communication, and harnessing social and political innovation from the grassroots. The exchanges that take place during the World Forum meetings focus on real-life initiatives by public authorities or grassroots actors, which are critically examined by an interdisciplinary international panel. The insights gathered during the meetings inform the work of the Council of Europe and its partners in the field of democracy and democratic governance.

The theme for 2017 is "Is populism a problem?".

== History ==
=== World Forum for Democracy 2012 ===
The World Forum for Democracy was launched in 2012 on the initiative of Secretary General of the Council of Europe Thorbjørn Jagland. The first edition took place between 5 and 11 October 2012 and was titled "Bridging the gap: democracy between old models and new realities". The discussions dealt with a broad range of issues, including the fate of democracy in post-Arab Spring countries, youth and democracy, the democratic potential of the internet and the impact of the economic crisis on democracy. The Forum was inaugurated by UN Secretary-General Ban Ki-moon. Other speakers included Nobel Peace Prize winner Tawakkol Karman and Egyptian activist Nawal El Saadawi.

=== World Forum for Democracy 2013 ===
The second World Forum ("Re-wiring Democracy: connecting institutions and citizens in the digital age") was held between 23 and 29 November 2013 and addressed the impact of new information and communication technologies on democratic practices. The discussions on the initiatives presented at the Forum were organized in 21 "labs", each focusing on a different aspect of e-democracy. The debates covered subjects such as liquid democracy, participatory budgeting, e-government platforms and the use of crowdsourcing in law-making. Speakers at this year's Forum included Abdou Diouf, Secretary General of La Francophonie, and Mary Kaldor, Professor of Global Governance at the London School of Economics.

The 2013 Forum introduced the "Democracy Innovation Award", a prize awarded by the Council of Europe to one of the showcased initiatives in recognition of its contribution to the enhancement of public participation in the democratic process. Based on the votes cast by Forum participants, the award was given to Women of Uganda Network (WOUGNET).

==== Showcased initiatives ====
- Liquid democracy by Pirate Party Germany (Germany)
- Change.org (International)
- Russian Public Initiative (Russian Federation)
- It's all about Freedom (Philippines)
- Questionnez Vos Elus by FACEP (France)
- Natalia Project by Civil Rights Defenders (Sweden)
- Tails by National Democratic Institute (USA)
- Balkanleaks (Bulgaria)
- OpenNet Initiative (Canada)
- Semantic polling by Semiocast (France)
- Legislative crowdsourcing by Finnish Parliament & Open Ministry (Finland)
- Parlement & Citoyens (France)
- Networked Networks by The Democratic Society (United Kingdom)
- Your Priorities by Citizens Foundation (Iceland)
- iHub (Kenya)
- Electoral Risk Management by International IDEA (International)
- CiviQ (Ireland)
- Direct democracy - The Swiss experience (Switzerland)
- Citizinvestor (USA)
- PortoAlegre wikicity (Brasil)
- Participatory budgeting by Municipality of Amadora (Portugal)
- Participatory budgeting by 49th Ward of Chicago (USA)
- Puzzled by Policy by DERI, NUI Galway (Ireland)
- Loomio (New Zealand)
- CitYsens (Spain)
- Women of Uganda Network (Uganda)
- Tavaana: E-Learning Institute for Iranian Civil Society (Iran)
- Tunisie4.0 by Nesselfen (Tunisia)
- Lenguas Jovenes (Languages of Youth) by Puerta Joven (Mexico)
- The Guardian Global Citizen Journalism Programme (International)
- ARD News (Germany)
- G1000 (Belgium)
- Onlife Manifesto (Europe)
- No Hate Speech Movement (Europe)
- League of Young Voters (Europe)

=== World Forum for Democracy 2014 ===
The third World Forum for Democracy ("From participation to influence: can youth revitalise democracy?") took place between 3 and 5 November 2014 and tackled the issue of youth participation. The lab discussions focused on initiatives to promote the inclusion of young people in the decision-making process and encourage civic engagement among youth. On the first day of the Forum, a keynote address was delivered by Jeremy Rifkin on his theory of the "zero marginal cost society". Other speakers included Chantal Mouffe, Director of the Centre of Democracy at the University of Westminster, Felipe Jeldres, President of the International Union of Socialist Youth, and Yves Leterme, Secretary-General of International IDEA. This edition featured six "unconferences", whose agendas were determined by the attendees themselves prior to the Forum. The 2014 Democracy Innovation Award was presented to the Turkish initiative "Generation Democracy".

==== Showcased initiatives ====
- NSS-Community Connect Fellowship by Blue Ribbon Movement (India)
- Generation Citizen (USA)
- SIM Democracy by Friedrich Naumann Foundation for Freedom (Thailand)
- School Film Studio as Citizenship Laboratory by European Wergeland Centre (Norway) in cooperation with Moscow School of Civic Education (Russian Federation)
- Project Unify by Special Olympics (Belgium)
- Stork Heinar by Endstation Rechts (Germany)
- No-nazi.net by Amadeu Antonio Foundation (Germany)
- Young Democracy Creators by Apollonia, Local Mission Haut-Rhin North and Association Meinau Neuhof (France)
- Junior Councils by Mwanza Youth and Children Network (Tanzania)
- ActionAid (Bangladesh)
- Your Priorities 3D by Citizens Foundation (Iceland)
- Learning to Count (Youth Participatory Budgeting) by In Loco Association (France, UK, Portugal)
- Generation Democracy by European Union and Council of Europe, in partnership with the Turkish Ministry of National Education and Board of Education (Turkey)
- Citizen’s Jury by newDemocracy Foundation (Australia)
- The 2014 Governmental Commission on Democracy – Participation and equal influence (Sweden)
- Youth Create Change by GIZ (Palestinian Territories)
- Youth for Catania 2.0 (Italy)
- Youth@Cluj-Napoca 2015 (European Youth Capital) by SHARE Cluj-Napoca Federation (Romania)
- Project Citizen by Center for Civic Education (USA)
- Project Citizen by Moroccan Center for Civic Education (Morocco)
- Have Your Say – The Structured Dialogue of Youth by Czech Council of Children and Youth (Czech Republic)
- Alsatian Youth Parliament (France)
- VotenaWeb (Brazil)
- Y8/Y20 Summit by Policy Innovation e.V. (Germany)
- Youth Election Training: My Choice by Democratic Youth Movement (Bosnia and Herzegovina)
- Chabab 2012 by Circle of Young Democrats of Morocco (Morocco)
- DemocracyOS and Net Party (Argentina)
- #YoSoy132 (Mexico)
- UK Youth Parliament (United Kingdom)
- Youth Parliament Indonesia by Indonesian Future Leaders (Indonesia)
- Lewisham Young Mayor Programme by London Borough of Lewisham (United Kingdom)

=== World Forum for Democracy 2015 ===
==== “Freedom vs control: For a democratic response” ====
The fourth edition of the Forum, “Freedom vs control: For a democratic response”, took place from 16–21 November. The objective of the 2015 Forum is to identify ways of reinforcing democratic oversight over security responses, to address fear driven by violent attacks, and to guarantee media freedom in a context of increased security measures. Decision-makers, opinion leaders and social innovators will debate the approaches to be adopted at the international, national, regional and local level in order to ensure the protection of freedom in democracy facing violence and extremism. These exchanges will be based on initiatives and ideas which have been selected through an open call and will be submitted for critical review by Forum participants.

The Forum's debates should help inspire states, local authorities and organisations across the world and pave the way for future work by the Council of Europe and other organisations in this field. The choice of this topic lies on a common sentiment that links together democracies worldwide: the sentiment of exposure to a diverse range of threats, from violent extremism to economic, technological, environmental and geopolitical risks. Modern societies are aware that these threats (especially violent attacks driven by ideology) can reinforce conflicts, destabilise society and, as a consequence, discourage social cohesion. Moreover, the increase in online control has led to a lack of personal data protection. On the one hand, a certain level of control might preserve citizens’ safety, but on the other hand it might represent a threat to freedom and democracy. The World Forum for Democracy will analyse the delicate balance between security and freedom and how it can be maintained in a democratic society when it is under threat: can freedom and control coexist in a democratic world?

The main goal of the Forum is to suggest solutions and promote measures which will ensure security and safeguard democracy. In the era of communication technology this is particularly important. The forum will raise awareness of new ideas on democratic responses to security challenges. These ideas will be examined under three main lenses, or challenges.

==== The three Challenges ====
* Challenge 1 – Ensuring security and bringing surveillance under control

The first challenge questions the importance of mass surveillance in order to defend citizens from threats, for instance from terrorism. The growing tension between the concern for safety and the protection of freedoms is one of the key challenges facing democracies today. The revelations of intelligence agency interception of digital networks have undermined trust in government's capacity to oversee these agencies. How much freedom are we prepared to give up in order to defend our societies from terrorism? How can democracies deal with security risks linked to the digital revolution without jeopardising fundamental democratic values?

If it is true that mass surveillance is a key in the fight of terrorism and organised crime, to what extent can citizens accept this lack of privacy and the restriction of personal freedom?

* Challenge 2 – Liberating society from fear and nurturing the desire for freedom

The second challenge addresses the fear generated by violent attacks driven by ideology. Such fear discourages social inclusion and can generate negative feelings among citizens; for example, discrimination, segregation and stigmatization. It will be discussed whether or not fear is rooted in the ignorance of the culture of “the other”. Moreover, it will be questioned how it is possible to orient public opinion towards a more open and positive perception in order to encourage a more open and inclusive society. These actions aim to reduce anxiety and discourage extreme and violent ideologies. Education should foster shared humanistic values and encourage trust between citizens and the institutions.

* Challenge 3 – Freedom of information in the “age of terror”

This third challenge analyses a wide range of topics: from the importance of whistleblowing, to the protection of freedom of expression, one of the main pillars of a democratic society. What should be the adequate response of media to ideological violence and terrorism? What is the impact of media ownership, and the control of major internet companies over personal and other data, on freedom and democratic debate? If whistleblowing is a necessary element of democratic control over institutions, how can whistleblowers be protected by the risk of abusive prosecution?

==== Showcased initiatives ====
- Legal Campaigns, Revolution Truth (USA)
- Holding intelligence agencies accountable through international law, Privacy International (United Kingdom)
- Cryptocat, INRIA (France)
- Mass surveillance vs encryption, Parliamentary Assembly of the Council of Europe
- Jury Duty Revisited, Global Organization of Parliamentarians Against Corruption
- Citizens' Juries - Setting Standards on Freedom Laws, newDemocracy Foundation (Australia)
- Civil Society Coalition on Oil and Gas, Water Governance Institute (Uganda)
- Amnesty International (Turkey)
- Terms of Service and Human Rights, Center for Technology and Society of the FGV Rio Law School (Brazil)
- Qwant (France)
- Facing Facts!, CEJI - A Jewish Contribution to an Inclusive Europe (Belgium)
- Interfaith Tour, Coexister (France)
- No Hate Parliamentary Alliance, Parliamentary Assembly of the Council of Europe
- Anti-prejudice training in prisons, Saint Stefan prison of Patras (Greece)
- Competences for Democratic Culture, Council of Europe Education Department
- Intercultural Dialogue Awareness Raising for Cooperation, Youth Service Organisation (Rwanda)
- Madrid +10, Club of Madrid (Spain)
- Dream Thailand, Friedrich Naumann Foundation for Freedom (Thailand)
- More than one story, Department of Culture and Leisure of the Municipality of Simrishamn (Sweden)
- The “Aarhus model” of reintegrating foreign fighters, East Jutland Police and Aarhus Municipality (Denmark)
- The Welcoming approach to community development, Welcoming America (USA)
- Observatory for the Protection of Human Rights Defenders, International Federation for Human Rights and World Organization Against Torture
- Working Group on Enabling and Protecting Civil Society, Community of Democracies
- PubLeaks, Free Press Unlimited (The Netherlands)
- GlobaLeaks, Hermes Center for Transparency and Digital Human Rights (Italy)
- Platform to promote the Protection and Safety of Journalists, European Federation of Journalists and Council of Europe
- How do I know, Palestinian Center for Development and Media Freedoms, Palestinian National Authority
- Between media regulation and the protection of personal data
- SMART (Syrian Media Action Revolution Team) (Syria)
- Grani.ru (Russian Federation)
- Multi-stakeholder Internet governance, ICANN

==== New features introduced with the 2015 World Forum for Democracy ====
===== Children’s Forum =====
Recognising the importance of educating children for democracy from the early ages, the Council of Europe offered to them a dedicated space, “Children’s Forum”, to allow them to express freely, to participate, to learn voting as the parliamentarians do, to cast their vote, to learn and ask questions about their rights, to innovate, in a context which allowed their voice heard at European level.

On 3 March 2016, the Council of Europe hosted in its hemicycle the Children's Forum, an event part of the World Forum for Democracy. 1200 students from 45 primary schools of Alsace region, France, who took part in a civic education project run by the Alsatian Themis Association, came to present their proposals for enhancing democracy and human rights.

The proposals were focused on one of the following three main themes: living together and participation, citizens of Internet, and all different, all equal. The students were assisted in this work by their teachers and ten proposals were shortlisted by a jury and further presented and put on open vote during the Children Forum. The winner received the trophy of the Children's Forum.

===== Satellite events =====
In order to reach out to a wider range of contributors and enrich the debate, the Forum welcomes the organisation of “satellite events” by universities renowned in the sphere of political studies and international relations, non-governmental organisations, municipalities and other institutions.

The organising institutions are free to decide independently about the dates and format of the event, the speakers and the specific topic(s). The satellite events can take place any time during the year. Possible formats include seminars or a seminar series, lectures in schools, surveys, social media campaigns, hackathons, local implementation of innovation initiatives presented in previous Forums, radio/TV debates, or lightning talks with public at large (at NGOs, schools, community centres, etc.).

In 2015, four outstanding universities organised satellite events related to the Forum's topic:

- College of Europe, Bruges, Belgium: “The challenges of free speech and democratic debate online”
- Hertie School of Governance, Berlin, Germany: “Digital whistleblowing: blessing or curse?”
- Central European University, Budapest, Hungary: “Freedom from fear in a diverse society”
- Windesheim University of Applied Sciences in Zwolle, the Netherlands: World Forum for Democracy “Freedom vs control”

===== Incubator for participatory democracy =====
The incubator for participatory democracy is based on an alliance of democracy innovators, brought together by the Council of Europe at the World Forum for Democracy. Its purpose is to connect city governments in Europe and beyond with democracy innovators to replicate and scale up democratic innovations. The incubator supports initiatives - digital and offline - that contribute to the redistribution of political power towards citizens, and that support the broadest possible citizen participation in the cities’ decision-making procedures. The incubator builds an open infrastructure to boost democracy for inclusive and innovative cities. In the frame of World Forum for Democracy 2015, 30 experts, researchers, elected representatives from cities, social and democratic innovators, grassroots activists and civil servants gathered in a so-called “Hackaton” - a collaborative workshop where they thought about and discussed the best ways to support the development of transparent, participative and collaborative democracy.

=== World Forum for Democracy 2016 ===
==== “Education and democracy: how to bridge the social divides?” ====
The 2016 World Forum for Democracy took place in Strasbourg, 7–9 November. It focused on the relationship between education and democracy. It examined whether they can reinforce each other and together address the risks of new social divides. In particular, the forum explored how education and democracy can nurture active citizens with critical and analytical skills, and how through fostering grassroots innovation and bottom-up democratic reform, it can help develop civic engagement and improve opportunities for all.

Acknowledging the central role of education at personal and societal level, and the relation between the acquired degree of education and the active participation in elections and generally into a democratic society, the relation between access to education and the prospect to become an informed, conscious and active citizen, the Forum sought to respond to questions as:

Is education fulfilling its democratic mission or is it failing to build the key qualities for democratic citizenship? What is role of different education actors – teachers, learners, families, civil society organisations, public authorities, and the media? Is it necessary to reform the organisation and functioning of educational institutions in order to better respond to the requirements of democracy? How non-formal and informal education can break the link between social inequality and political inequality and help nurture active citizens and leaders from disadvantaged backgrounds to drive sustainable change?

=== World Forum for Democracy 2017 ===
==== "Is populism a problem?" ====
The 2017 World Forum for Democracy took place in Strasbourg, 8–10 November 2017. It was focused on "a growing disconnect between citizens and political elites, and dramatic changes in the media ecosystem", as well as "new political and media actors and practices are emerging, offering new opportunities for members of the public to participate in political life."

=== World Forum for Democracy 2018 ===
==== "Gender Equality: Whose Battle?" ====
The World Forum for Democracy 2018 was dedicated to gender equality and women’s rights. It focused in particular on women’s public, political and economic participation and on combating violence against women in the wake of #MeToo.

The Forum took place in Strasbourg from 19 to 21 November 2018. The winner of the 2018 Democracy Innovation Award was the initiative Self-Representation of Women in Kenyan Courts.

=== World Forum for Democracy 2019 ===
==== "Is democracy in danger in the information age?" ====
The edition of 2019 was dedicated to the changes brought about by the abundance of information. According to the organisers: "[t]he volume, the content, the platforms: each of these has evolved beyond recognition in a short period of time. This evolution continues. Twenty-five years ago, most of our information came from print publications, television and radio. Today, these are complemented, rivalled and often eclipsed by websites, blogs and social media. Well-known outlets have been joined by a plethora of new sources – including millions of individuals – that spread news with the click of a share button." The main questions addressed the extent to which the information was reliable and whether it helped or hindered the citizens in taking part in democratic processes. It also addressed the lessons helping democracies ensure the free flow of information in the future.

The Forum took place from 6 to 8 November 2019. The winner of the Democracy Innovation Award was the initiative Follow the Money, from Nigeria, presented at the workshop “Rebuilding Trust in Institutions”
