= Online deliberation =

Online deliberation is a broad term used to describe many forms of non-institutional, institutional and experimental online discussions. The term also describes the emerging field of practice and research related to the design, implementation and study of deliberative processes that rely on the use of electronic information and communications technologies (ICT).

Although the Internet and social media have fostered discursive participation and deliberation online through computer-mediated communication, the academic study of online deliberation started in the early 2000s.

== Effective support for online deliberation ==
A range of studies have suggested that group size, volume of communication, interactivity between participants, message characteristics, and social media characteristics can impact online deliberation. and that democratic deliberation varies across platforms. For example, news forums have been shown to have the highest degree of deliberation followed by news websites, and then Facebook. Differences in the effectiveness of platforms as supporting deliberation have been attributed based on numerous factors such as moderation, the availability of information, and focusing on a well defined topic.

A limited number of studies have explored the extent to which online deliberation can produce similar results to traditional, face-to-face deliberation. A 2004 deliberative poll comparing face-to-face and online deliberation on U.S. foreign policy found similar results. A similar study in 2012 in France found that, compared to the offline process, online deliberation was more likely to increase women’s participation and to promote the justification of arguments by participants.

Research on online deliberation suggests that there are five key design considerations that will affect the quality of dialogue: asynchronous communication vs synchronous communication, post hoc moderation vs pre-moderation, empowering spaces vs un-empowering spaces, asking discrete questions vs broad questions, and the quality of information. Other scholars have suggested that successful online deliberation follows four central rules: discussions must be inclusive, rational-critical, reciprocal and respectful.

In general, online deliberation requires participants to be able to work together comfortably in order to make the best possible deliberations which can often require rules and regulations that help members feel comfortable with one another.

== Challenges ==
Researchers have questioned the utility of online deliberation as an extension of the public sphere, arguing the idea that online deliberation is no less beneficial than face-to-face interaction. Computer-mediated discourse is deemed impersonal, and is found to encourage online incivility. Furthermore, some users who participate in online discussions about politics make comments only in groups that agree with their own views, indicating the possibility that online deliberation mainly promotes motivated reasoning and reinforces preexisting attitudes.

== Related disciplines ==
Scholarly research into online deliberation is interdisciplinary and includes practices such as online consultation, e-participation, e-government, Citizen-to-Citizen (C2C), online deliberative polling, crowdsourcing, online facilitation, online research communities, interactive e-learning, civic dialogue in Internet forums and online chat, and group decision making that utilizes collaborative software and other forms of computer-mediated communication. Work in all these endeavors is tied together by the challenge of using electronic media in a way that deepens thinking and improves mutual understanding.

== See also ==
- Argument map
- Computer supported cooperative work
- Deliberative democracy
- E-democracy
- Web annotation
- Wiki survey
- Popular tools:
  - Loomio
  - DemocracyOS
  - LiquidFeedback
  - Pol.is
