= World Movement for Democracy =

World Movement for Democracy (WMD) is an international network of individuals and organizations with the stated goal of promoting democracy.

== History ==
The World Movement was launched in February 1999 when the National Endowment for Democracy (NED) and two nongovernmental organizations in India brought together a cross-section of democracy activists, practitioners, and scholars from over 80 countries in New Delhi for discussions of ways to advance democracy. The participants adopted a Founding Statement launching the World Movement "to strengthen democracy where it is weak, to reform and invigorate democracy even where it is longstanding, and to bolster pro-democracy groups in countries that have not yet entered into a process of democratic transition." It is intended to unite the global community of democracy advocates and practitioners; to facilitate exchanges of information, knowledge, and experiences; and to build cross-border solidarity. The World Movement is led by an international steering committee, and NED currently serves as its secretariat.

A "network of networks", the World Movement has led to the establishment of regional networks, including the African Democracy Forum (ADF), the Latin America and Caribbean Network for Democracy (LAC Network), and the World Forum for Democratization in Asia (WFDA), as well as functional global networks, including the Global Network on Local Governance (GNLG), the International Women’s Democracy Network (IWDN), the Network of Democracy Research Institutes (NDRI), and the World Youth Movement for Democracy (WYMD).

The World Movement has held eleven global assemblies including its founding in New Delhi in 1999: São Paulo, Brazil (2000); Durban, South Africa (2004); Istanbul, Turkey (2006); Kyiv, Ukraine (2008); Jakarta, Indonesia (2010); Lima, Peru (2012); Seoul, South Korea (2015); Darkar, Senegal (2018); the tenth global assembly was held virtually in 2021; Taipei, Taiwan (2022). The Twelfth Global Assembly will be held in Johannesburg, South Africa in 2024. It has also initiated two major projects as a result of assembly discussions: The Defending Civil Society project was launched in 2006 in collaboration with the International Center for Not-for-Profit Law (ICNL) to respond to efforts among an increasing number of governments to close down civil society space, particularly for democracy and human rights groups, through new “NGO laws” and restrictions on international funding.

In 2016, India's Ministry of Home Affairs (MHA) placed the WMD on a watch list forbidding them from extending any financial assistance to other NGOs or individuals without prior explicit permission.
