= Pol.is =

Open-source software

Polis
- Developer: The Computational Democracy Project - a 501(c)(3) nonprofit
- Release: October 13, 2012
- License: AGPLv3 (open-source)
- Website: https://pol.is
- Repository: github.com/compdemocracy/polis

Polis (or Pol.is) is wiki survey software designed for large group collaborations. As a civic technology, Polis allows people to share their opinions and ideas, and its algorithm is intended to elevate ideas that can facilitate better decision-making, especially when there are lots of participants.

Polis has been credited for assisting the passage of legislation in Taiwan. Pol.is has been used by governments in the United States, Canada, Singapore, Philippines, Finland, Spain and elsewhere.

== History ==
Pol.is was founded by Colin Megill, Christopher Small, and Michael Bjorkegren after the Occupy Wall Street and Arab Spring movements.

In Taiwan, pol.is has been "one of the key parts" of vTaiwan's suite of open-source tools for its citizen engagement efforts arising out of the Sunflower Student Movement. vTaiwan claims that of the 26 national issues related to technology discussed on the platform, 80% led to government action. Pol.is is also utilized by "Join," a national platform for online deliberation run by the Taiwanese government.

In 2022, Wired reported that Polis was an influence on the Community Notes project at Twitter.

In 2023, Megill advised OpenAI on how to facilitate deliberation at scale in a way that was more efficient than Polis, which still required significant human labor and analysis at the time. He helped to award $1 million in grants to teams working on solving the problem of deliberation at scale. In 2023, Anthropic was also exploring steering model behavior using Polis.

In 2025, it helped the county that includes Bowling Green, Kentucky make a 25 year plan by facilitating the collection and review of ideas from thousands of residents, representing 10% of the county. 2,370 of 3,940 unique ideas were agreed-upon by over 80% of survey respondents. Ideas were screened by volunteers if they were redundant to an existing idea, off-topic or obscene.

== How it works ==
Pol.is participants are anonymous and cannot reply directly to others posts, in an effort to avoid personal attacks for users. Its algorithms are designed not for engagement and scrolling, but to find areas of agreement to better understand the nuances of a wide range of opinions. Participants are prompted for ideas and vote on other participants' ideas.

== Reception ==
Andrew Leonard, The Financial Times, and VentureBeat describe Pol.is as a possible antidote to the divisiveness of traditional internet discourse by gamifying consensus. Audrey Tang agreed saying, "Polis is quite well known in that it's a kind of social media that instead of polarizing people to drive so called engagement or addiction or attention, it automatically drives bridge making narratives and statements. So only the ideas that speak to both sides or to multiple sides will gain prominence in Polis."

Niall Ferguson argues that the approach to utilize tools like Pol.is and Join in Taiwan empowers ordinary people instead of the elite and protects individual freedoms, providing a contrast to the AI-enhanced panopticon model seen in China.

Carl Miller praised the technology as having "gamified finding consensus."

Darshana Narayanan, in an op-ed in the Economist, argues that open-source machine-learning-based tools like Polis can help to bypass the influence of special interests or experts.

Jamie Susskind cited Polis and vTaiwan as a model for democracies, particularly around digital policy issues.

== See also ==
- Deliberative democracy
- Deliberative opinion poll
- Habermas machine
- Recommender system#Decision-making
- Social media#Criticism, debate and controversy
