= Democratic Youth Movement =

Democratic Youth Movement Demokratski omladinski pokret
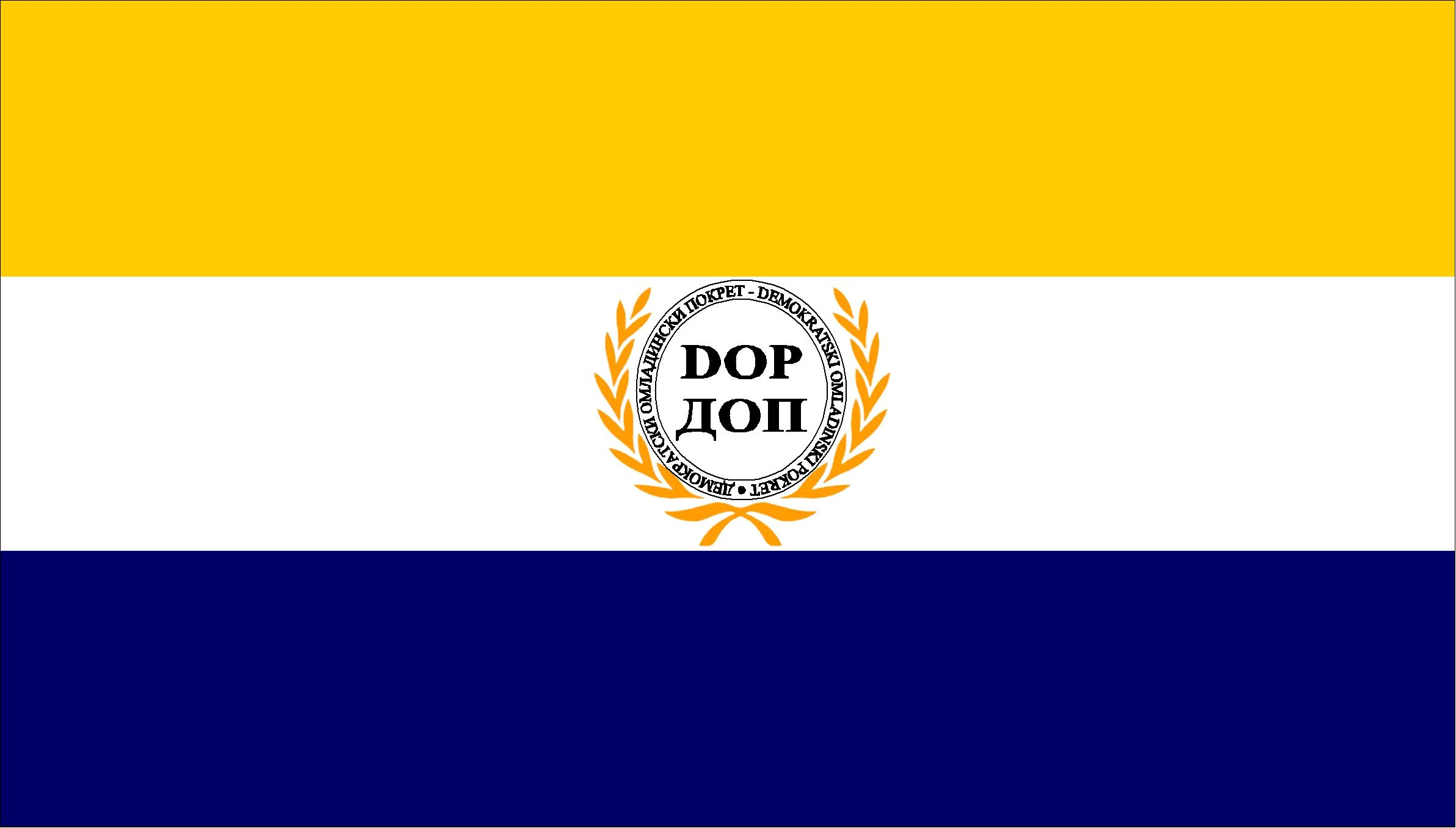
- Leader: Ernad Deni Čomaga
- Founded: 2005
- Headquarters: Soukbunar 16, 71000 Sarajevo
- Ideology: Humanism
- International affiliation: World Youth Movement for Democracy
- Colours: yellow white blue
- Ethnic group: Multi-ethnic

Website
- http://dop.ba/

The Democratic Youth Movement (Demokratski omladinski pokret), is a NGO in Bosnia and Herzegovina. It was founded in 2005, as youth movement for freedom, democracy and unity of Bosnia and Herzegovina. They have never participated in regular elections, but they work on another level of activity. This movement is famous in Bosnia and Herzegovina, because of the demonstrations they organize against wars around the world, bad social situation in Bosnia and Herzegowina and unrecognition of the rights of youth.

The president of the organization is Ernad Deni Čomaga a youth politician who fights for the rights of the youth in Bosnia and Herzegovina. The movement is a democratic organisation with democratic organs.
