= Collaborative decision-making software =

Collaborative decision-making (CDM) software is a software application or module that helps to coordinate and disseminate data and reach consensus among work groups.

Collaborative decision-making software coordinates the functions and features required to arrive at timely collective decisions, enabling all relevant stakeholders to participate in the process.

The selection of communication tools is very important for high end collaborative efforts. Online collaboration tools have differences, such as the use of internet based managing. Virtual teams often have to discuss, analyze and find solutions to problems through continuous brain storming session collectively. An emerging enhancement in the integration of social networking and business intelligence (BI), has improvised the decision making by directly linking the information on BI systems with collectively gathered inputs from social software.

Nowadays all the organizations are dependent on business intelligence (BI) tools so that their employers can make better decisions based on the processed information in tools. The application of social software in business intelligence (BI) to the decision-making process provides a significant opportunity to tie information directly to the decisions made throughout the company.

== History ==
Technology scientists and researchers have worked and explored automated decision Support Systems (DSS) for around 40 years. The research initiated with building model-driven DSS in the late 1960s. Advanced with usage of financial related planning systems, spreadsheet-based decision Support Systems and group decision support systems (GDSS) started in the early and mid-1980s. Data warehouses, managerial Information Systems, online analytical processing (OLAP) and business Intelligence emerged in late 1980s and mid-1990s and around same time the knowledge driven DSS and the usage of web-based DSS were evolving significantly. The field of automated decision support is emerging to utilize new advancements and create new applications.

In the 1960s, scientists deliberately started examining the utilization of automated quantitative models to help with basic decision making and planning. Automated decision support systems have become more of real time scenarios with the advancement of minicomputers, timeshare working frameworks and distributed computing. The historical backdrop of the execution of such frameworks starts in the mid-1960s. In a technology field as assorted as DSS, chronicling history is neither slick nor direct. Diverse individuals see the field of decision Support Systems from different vantage focuses and report distinctive records of what happened and what was important. As technology emerged new automated decision support applications were created and worked upon. Scientists utilized multiple frameworks to create and comprehend these applications. Today one can arrange the historical backdrop of DSS into the five expansive DSS classes, including: communications-driven, data-driven, document driven, knowledge-driven and model-driven decision support systems. Model-driven spatial decision support system (SDSS) was developed in the late 1980s and by 1995 the SDSS idea had turned out to be recognized in the literature. Data driven spatial DSS are also quite regular. All in all, a data-driven DSS stresses access to and control of a time-series of internal organization information and sometimes external and current data. Executive Information Systems are cases of data driven DSS.The very first cases of these frameworks were called data-oriented DSS, analysis Information Systems and recovery. Communications-driven DSS utilize networks and communications technologies to facilitate decision-relevant collaboration and communication. In these frameworks, communications technologies are the overwhelming design segment. Devices utilized incorporate groupware, video conferencing and computer-based bulletin boards.

In 1989, Lotus presented a groupware application called Notes and expanded the focus of GDSS to incorporate upgrading communication, collaboration and coordination among gatherings of individuals. In general, groupware, bulletin boards, audio and videoconferencing are the essential advancements for communications-driven decision support. In the last couple of years, voice and video started utilizing the Internet convention and have incredibly extended the conceivable outcomes for synchronous communications-driven DSS. A document driven DSS utilizes PC storage and processing technologies to give record recovery and investigation. Huge archived databases may incorporate examined reports, hypertext records, pictures, sounds and video. Content and record administration expanded in the 1970s and 1980s as a critical, generally utilized automated means for presenting and preparing bits of content. Cases of archives that may be retrieved by a document driven DSS are strategies and techniques, item determinations, catalogs and corporate verifiable reports, including minutes of meetings and correspondence. A search engine is an essential decision-aiding tool connected with document-driven DSS. Knowledge-driven DSS can propose or prescribe actions to managers. These DSS are individual PC frameworks with specific critical thinking ability risen. The "expertise" comprises knowledge around a specific area, comprehension of issues inside that space, and "skill" at taking care of some of these issues. These frameworks have been called suggestion DSS and knowledge-based DSS.

Web based DSS, starting in roughly 1995, the far reaching Web and worldwide Internet gave an innovation stage to encourage developing the abilities and sending of automated choice support. The arrival of the HTML 2. details with shape labels and tables was a defining moment in the advancement of web-based DSS. In 1995, various papers were introduced on utilizing the Web and Internet for choice support at the third International conference of the International society for decision support systems (ISDSS). Notwithstanding web-based, model-driven DSS, analysts were reporting web access to data warehouses. DSS Research Resources was begun as an online gathering of bookmarks. By 1995, the World Wide Web was perceived by various programming designers and scholastics as a genuine stage for executing a wide range of decision-support systems. In 1996-97, corporate intranets were produced to support information exchange and knowledge management. The primary decision-support apparatuses included specially appointed question and reporting instruments, improvement and recreation models, online analytical processing (OLAP), data mining and data visualization. Enterprise wide DSS utilizing database technologies were particularly well known among large organizations. In 1999, sellers presented new Web-based analytical applications. Numerous DBMS merchants moved their center to web-based analytical applications and business intelligence solutions. In 2000, application service providers (ASPs) started facilitating the application programming and specialized foundation for decision support capabilities. Additionally the year 2000 was a gateway. More advanced "enterprise knowledge portals" were presented by sellers that combined information portals, knowledge management, business intelligence, and communications-driven DSS in an integrated web environment.

Decision support applications and research concentrates on identified data-oriented systems, management expert systems, multidimensional data analysis, query and reporting tools, online analytical processing (OLAP), business Intelligence, group DSS, conferencing and groupware, document management, spatial DSS and executive Information Systems as the technologies rise, meet and wander. The investigation of decision support systems is a connected train that utilizes learning and particularly hypothesis from different disciplines. Consequently, numerous DSS scientists look into inquiries that have been analyzed on the grounds that they were of worry to individuals who were building and utilizing particular DSS. Subsequently, a great part of the wide DSS information base gives speculations and headings to building more powerful DSS.

== CDM and Business Intelligence ==
Web 2.0 collaboration tools have reached the mass collaboration expectations by crossing the limits of Web 1.0 collaboration tools. These tools provide a user controlled environment with social software in an inexpensive and flexible approach. The raise of collaboration 2.0 technologies are being accepted in the corporate. Social and collaborative business intelligence (BI) were recognized as a sub category with in BI work space in the year 2009. Social and collaborative BI, a type of CDM software, harnesses the functions and philosophies of social networking and social Web 2.0 technologies, applying them to reporting and analytics at the enterprise level, to facilitate better and faster fact-based decision-making. This platform, such as Web 2.0 technologies, is designed around the premise that anyone should be able to share content and contribute to discussion. Since 2010 there is an inclination to consolidate highlights from informal organizations into Business Intelligence arrangements. A wide range of business applications may take after this change in the coming years.

International Data Corporation (IDC) predicted that 2011 would be the year where the trend of embedding social media style features into BI solutions would make its mark, and that virtually all types of business applications would undergo a fundamental transformation. IDC also believed the emerging CDM software market would grow quickly, forecasting revenues of nearly $2 billion by 2014, with a compound annual growth rate of 38.2 percent between the years 2009 and 2014. CDM software, in the context of BI, is the ability to share and institutionalize information, analysis and insight, which would otherwise be lost.

Business Intelligence (BI) has been broadly utilized to oversee and refine incomprehensible supplies of information. Many organizations have applied business Intelligence in their firms in order to refine their own data for better understanding and decision making. BI also has its applications in statistical analysis, predictive modelling and optimization. The different reports generated by these products play a major role in decision making. Decision Making is an important task in the job as the consequences of a decision effect the growth and performance of the organization. Collaborative Decision Making (CDM) joins social programming with business insight. This mix can drastically enhance the nature of basic decision making by specifically connecting the data contained in BI frameworks with collective information gathered using social programming. User associations could cobble together such a framework with existing social programming, BI stages and essential labeling usefulness. CDM is a rising segment of numerous application sorts - including BI, human resources (HR), ability administration and suites - however it is likewise a conduct realized by the utilization of Web 2.0 applications. In the vanguard of this pattern is the way that BI is being incorporated with shared, cloud-based applications. Virtual world Second Life is additionally rising as a stage for collaborative decision making. The key advantage of this is "breaking down space" and the capacity to mix synchronous and asynchronous exercises. For meetings and occasions, the advantages of having all the significant data and individuals on request, which evacuates the limitations of timetable and geology. Service oriented architecture (SOA) has assumed an essential part in making this a reality. BI pervades a whole association and, if utilized effectively, can decidedly impact choices that influence each useful territory.

Now collective Decision Making (CDM) is a joint government/industry activity went for enhancing air movement stream administration through expanded data trade among aeronautics group partners. CDM is included agents from government, general flight, carriers, private industry and the scholarly world who cooperate to make mechanical and procedural answers for the air traffic flow management (ATFM) challenges confronted by the national airspace system (NAS). New techniques are being used to maximize understanding and improve collaborative Decision Making in areas such as design reviews, construction planning and integrated operations.

Today's BI tools are doing good work in terms of extracting right information for the right people, but lack of accountability in decision making process is leading the organizations into poor choices. Though there is lot of money invested in the business Intelligence software and data warehouse technology, the output of these is still giving bad business choices. There is a gap created between level of information in business Intelligence and the quality and transparency of decision making. The problem has become so prevalent that the need for collaborative decision making (CDM) software, a new approach making complex business decisions that closely links information and reports gathered from social media collaboration tools emerged. CDM platforms will give users easy access to relevant BI data sources as well as the ability to tag and search those sources for future reference and accountability. The decision itself would be linked to the BI software inputs, collaboration tools and the methods and practices that were used to make that decision.

The need of making complex and efficient decisions with the power of information systems made the use of business intelligence in collaborative decision making The quality of the decisions depends on the effective utilization of BI and information integration in the business which include – capturing BI value, effective practice of BI applications and knowledgeable business officials with expertise in BI and IT knowledge.

== Benefits and potential ==
The concept of social and collaborative BI has been hailed by many as the answer to the persistent problem that, despite increasing investment in BI, many organizations are failing to utilize reporting and analytics effectively and continue to make poor business decisions, resulting in low ROI.

Gartner predicts that CDM platforms will stimulate a new approach to complex decision making by linking the information and reports gleaned from BI software with the latest social media collaboration tools.

Gartner's prognostic report, The Rise of Collaborative Decision Making, predicts that this new technology will minimize the cost and lag in the decision-making process, leading to improved productivity, operational efficiencies and ultimately, better, more timely decisions.

Recent McKinsey Global and Aberdeen Group research have indicated that organizations with collaborative technologies respond to business threats and complete key projects faster, experiencing decreased time to market for new products as well as improved employee satisfaction.

== Components ==
There are three major functions that combine together to enable effective enterprise collaboration and networking based on reporting and analytics, and form the basis of a CDM platform. These are the ability to:

1. Discuss and overlay knowledge on business data
2. Share knowledge and content
3. Collectively decide the best course of action

=== Discussing and overlaying knowledge on business data ===
Most decision-making and discussion surrounding business processes occurs outside organizational BI platforms, opening a gap between human insight and the business data itself. Business decisions should be made alongside business data to ensure steadfast, fact-based decision-making.

An open-access discussion forum integrated into the BI solution allows users to discuss the results of data analysis, connecting the right people with the right data. Users are able to overlay human knowledge, insight and provide context to the data in reports.

A social layer within a BI solution improves the efficiency of business interaction regarding reporting and analytics compared to traditional avenues of communication such as faxes, phone calls and face-to-face meetings by:

1. Being recordable: Conversations are automatically recorded, creating a searchable history of all interaction, eliminating unnecessarily revisiting points previously made
2. Eliminating logistical hurdles: The need for complex and costly travel arrangements is significantly reduced, with geographically dispersed stakeholders able to participate in the exchange of information faster
3. Enabling all relevant stakeholders to participate: All relevant stakeholders can contribute to discussion at their convenience

==== Key features of a CDM forum ====
Collaborative decision-making (CDM) is defined as social media feature which, if combined with BI applications, will allow an increased distribution and discussion of information through a number of key features. These key features include annotations, discussions, and tagging, embedding, and providing decisions. Annotations help others in accepting and interpreting the data, which makes it more significant. For instance, when users are creating or analyzing reports within the BI environment, they can add commentaries and annotations so as to offer context to the data. Business leaders can be observed to be assured that they completely understand the information on which decisions are grounded. Open-access discussions will allow the contributors to post their notions as well as to read, consider and enhance the proposals of others. This feature can be a valuable device for pursuing the input of other investors. This is because of how assimilating CDM tools within the BI environment offers the possibility to hold discussions in complete view of the significant data. Tagging, on the other hand, enables the users to highlight related information in a flexible manner which makes it easy for other user to examine and recover beneficial and practical data. The ability to embed information enclosed in a BI solution into other applications is a vital factor for making sure that precise information is made accessible to decision-makers in a sensible manner. When information is embedded, it can be seen and commented on by several users. Meaning to say, ideas and suggestions can also be shared and discoursed in actual. Lastly, BI solutions are observed to have the capability of supporting appropriate decision-making that supports groups to attain explicit, quantifiable goals and objectives. These may also comprise an improved product overview or more lucrative supply chain.

=== Sharing knowledge and content ===
The digital era is often described as the Information Age. But the value of information resides in its ability to be shared.

A CDM module allows information relating to reporting and analytics to be shared in three ways, by:

1. Cataloguing: A social layer within a BI solution allows users to create a searchable history by tagging and cataloging past discussions and reports within shared folders inside the BI portal. Tagging allows users to quickly and easily file report, annotation and discussion content under multiple categories for quick and easy retrieval.
2. Distributing: The ability to export entire files/reports from the BI portal keeps all relevant decision-makers properly informed. Likewise, sharing direct links to external information in a threaded discussion within the CDM platform adds necessary detail, context and perspective to discussion.
3. Embedding: A CDM layer within a BI tool enables users to embed reports and vital contextual content across platforms – wherever it is needed for decision-making.

==== A CDM module does this in two ways ====
1. Within the BI tool's social layer or enterprise portals (intranet system) via a web services application programming interface (API)
2. Outside the enterprise, on any platform, via YouTube style Java script export, enabling users to embed live interactive reports or other information by simply copying the Java script fragment into any HTML page

=== Collectively deciding the best course of action ===
Collaborative Decision Making (CDM) Systems are defined as cooperative computer-based systems which assist the elucidation of ill-structured difficulties by a set of decision makers who are functioning together as a team. Their main objective is to enlarge the effectiveness of decision clusters through the cooperative sharing of information among group members and the computer. CDM associates the social software with business intelligence in which this said amalgamation can radically improve the value of decision-making by directly connecting the information enclosed in BI systems with collaborative input garnered through the usage of social software. This has also been identified as collaborative BI which has become a collaborative decision-making (CDM) module. Accordingly, this attaches the purposes and philosophies of social networking and Web 2.0 technologies, putting them on to broadcasting and analytics. If this would be implemented properly, collaborative BI will have the capability to form important connections between people, data, process and technology which will then connect the gap concerning insight and action through assisting peoples’ normal decision-making procedures. In order for an organization to attain a real collaborative BI, they must requisite to implement a collaborative mentality as well and upkeep a culture of organization-wide data sharing and data entree. This halts down departmental silos, empowering quicker, improved and more operative decision-making. It is also observed as an inflexible precondition for success wherein if an organization has a culture where people are rewarded for hoarding evidence, or information, and being specialists without sharing, then that organization is not ready. Technology will be observed to not make an organization collaborative if it does not already upkeep the belief of teams from various business units functioning in concert on shared projects.

== Technology factors that underpin enterprise CDM ==
A BI CDM module is underpinned by three factors.

1 Ease of use: CDM software follows the Web 2.0 self-service mindset. The collaborative components within the BI solution cater for a diversity of user ability and skill levels to ensure knowledge does not remain departmentalized.

2 Fully integrated: Users must be able to discuss their analysis alongside their BI content. When the CDM platform is within the BI tool, users can immediately start the investigation, inviting others into the conversation in full view of the data.

3 Web-based: Being Web-based allows all relevant stakeholders to follow and contribute to discussion as it unfolds, regardless of location, time difference or device used to access it.

== Notable CDM modules in the Business Intelligence space ==
Social BI and CDM software is still in its infancy according to Gartner, and remains underutilized. However, a handful of vendors in the BI marketplace offer CDM modules, including:

- IBM Cognos (Optional add on)

While the offerings listed above are larger BI systems with upgrades for CDM features, there have emerged some dedicated web based, software-as-a-service CDM offerings, including:

- 1000minds
- Altova MetaTeam
- D-Sight
- Loomio
