= Dorothy Okello =

Ugandan technologist and electrical engineer

Eng. Dr. Dorothy Kabagaju Okello
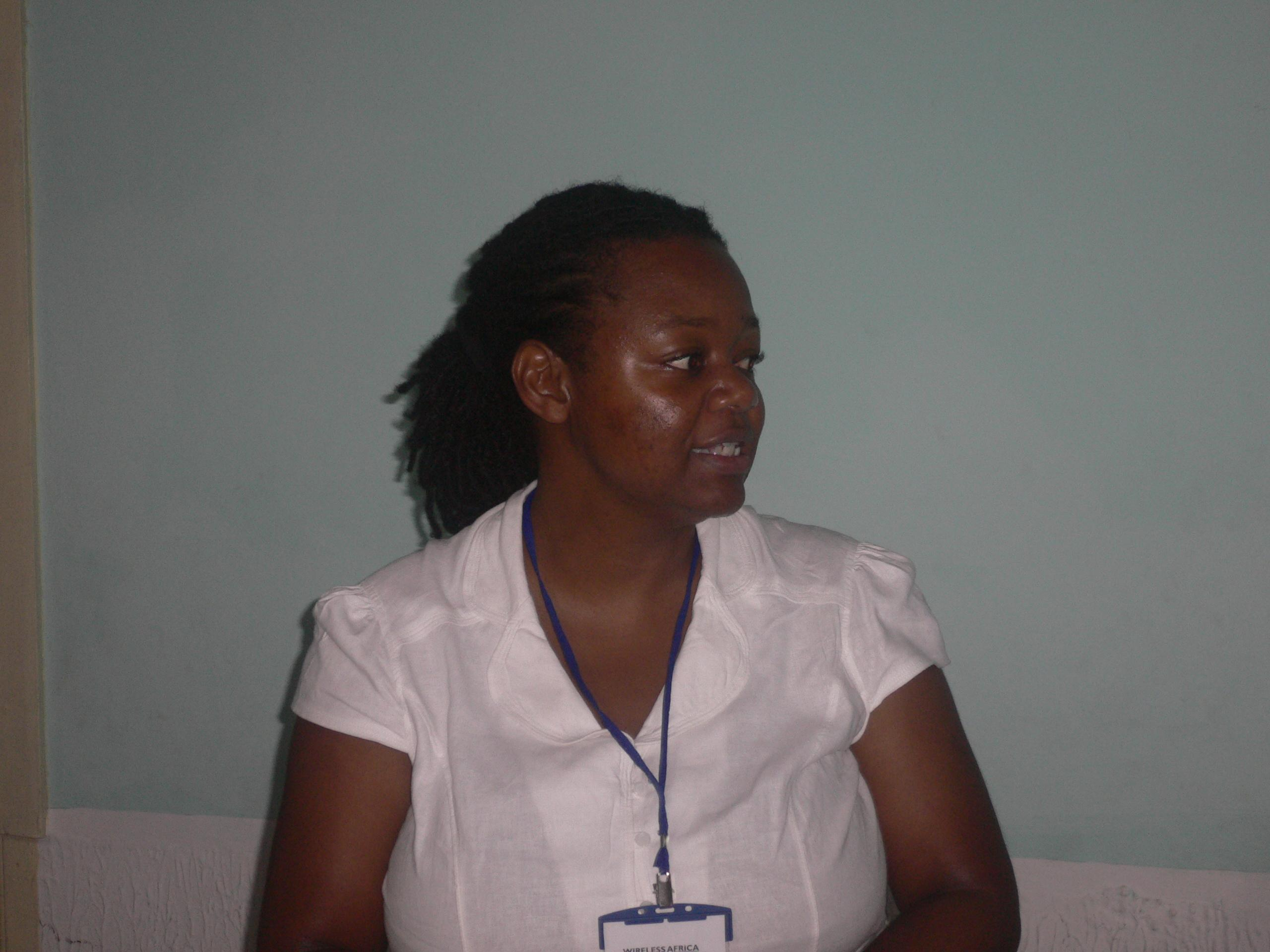
- Education: Makerere University (B.S. in Electrical Engineering, 1992); University of Kansas (M.S. in Electrical Engineering, 1999); McGill University (Ph.D. in Electrical Engineering, 2004)
- Engineering career
- Discipline: Professor, engineer
- Institutions: Board Chair Uganda Communications Commission; Former President, Uganda Institution of Professional Engineers
- Employer: Makerere University
- Projects: Women of Uganda Network WOUGNET; Eastern Africa Resilience Innovations Lab (EA RILab)

Dorothy Okello is a Ugandan electrical engineer, and professor known for founding the Women of Uganda Network or WOUGNET. In 2016, she became the first female president of the Uganda Institution of Professional Engineers

== Education ==
She has a BSc in electrical engineering from Makerere University, Uganda, obtained in 1992, an M.S. in Electrical Engineering (1999) from the University of Kansas where she was a Fulbright Scholar, and a Ph.D. in Electrical Engineering (2004) from McGill University in Montreal, Canada (where she received a Commonwealth Scholarship). She has worked to get more women and rural communities engaged in the information society.

== Career ==
She is currently the Dean School of Engineering at Makerere University. She is Africa's first-ever Digital Woman of the Year, an honour bestowed upon her at an Africa ICT Days gala ceremony for the Digital Woman Award finalists that took place on 16 November in Yaoundé, Cameroon.

In October 2012, Okello was awarded the Women Achievers Award for her service in empowering women and girls through Science and Technology.

Okello was elected as the first female president of the Uganda Institution of Professional Engineers at the institution AGM on 29 April 2016. On 2 June 2016 a congratulatory letter from the Irish President Michael D. Higgins was presented to her by the Irish Ambassador to Uganda Dónal Cronin on becoming the first female president of the institution.

In 2026 she was elected an International Fellow of the Royal Academy of Engineering..

== Academic authorship ==
She has carried out most of her research work with netLabs!UG, a research centre within the Department of Electrical and Computer Engineering at the university. Her work has been published in journals such as; (1) Coverage and rate of low density ABS assisted vertical heterogeneous network which was published in the 2022 IEEE 33rd Annual International Symposium on Personal, Indoor and Mobile Radio Communications (PIMRC) (2) Unmanned aerial vehicles: opportunities for developing countries and challenges which was published in the 2020 IST-Africa Conference (IST-Africa) (3) A deep reinforcement learning-based algorithm for reliability-aware multi-domain service deployment in smart ecosystems. (4) Effect of different organic substrates on reproductive biology, growth rate and offtake of the African night crawler earthworm (Eudrilus eugeniae). (5) Resource-aware workload orchestration for edge computing published in 2020 28th Telecommunications Forum (TELFOR). (6) Leveraging the technology of unmanned aerial vehicles for developing countries published in SAIEE Africa Research Journal. (7) Rebuilding the internet exchange point in Uganda published by the 2017 28th Irish Signals and Systems Conference (ISSC). (8) Regulatory and broadband industry responses to COVID-19: cases of Uganda, Peru, and the Caribbean. (9) Enabling models of Internet eXchange Points for developing contexts. (10) Co-designing with engineers for community engagement in rural Uganda published by Oxford University Press.

== Family ==
Okello is married with three children.
