= African Democracy Forum =

The African Democracy Forum (ADF), is a regional network launched in Abuja, Nigeria, in October 2000. It comprises civil society organisations, media institutions, community based organisations, academic institutions and donor entities that work on democracy, democratic research, protection of human rights, upholding the rule of law and promoting good governance through the twin principles of transparency and accountability in the African continent. ADF also acts as a platform for mutual support and sharing of resources for over 450 organisations and individuals. The ADF is a regional network of the World Movement for Democracy, a network of organizations from around the world advocating for democracy. The ADF uses the strength and knowledge of its members to create a strong network of communication. Its members include leading human rights and democracy activists who use their experiences to teach others.

== ADF Objectives ==
The ADF seeks to provide democrats with the opportunity to express their views, and to have a platform for mutual support and resources in an effort to consolidate democracy in Africa. The ADF works to monitor democracy on the continent, protect democrats, support the development of information technology in Africa, share advocacy skills, train members of the network, establish and maintain a dialogue with state leaders, empower individuals at the grass-roots level, and encourage civil society organizations in conflict areas to use the ADF to seek support.

== ADF Activities ==
The ADF General Assemblies focus on bringing together ADF members to develop civil society strategies to address specific issues, such as post-conflict elections, democracy education, monitoring human rights violations, and fighting against corruption. The ADF also holds conferences and workshops concerning democracy in post-conflict situations, and women's political participation in Africa. The ADF has created training programs on “Information and Communication Technologies,” “Democratic Leadership and Conflict Resolution,” and “Non-Violent Movement.” The organization also from time-to-time issues statements regarding issues that affect democratic development in Africa.

In addition to serving as the World Movement's Africa regional network, the ADF and its member organizations are involved in the non-governmental process for the Community of Democracies, and the Human Rights Council Network, or HRCNet.

== ADF History ==
Democrats in Africa founded the ADF in October 2000 in anticipation of the Second Assembly of the World Movement for Democracy. The ADF participated in the Assembly in São Paulo, Brazil, in November 2000 where 60 participants from 25 countries in Africa participated in workshops and worked together to create strategies to further democracy in Africa. The participants in the regional workshop created an extensive list of goals and tactics to help aid democracy in Africa, and outlined some of the issues impeding its growth.

=== Durban, South Africa- 2003 ===
In 2003, the ADF met in Durban, South Africa. At the conference, Ayesha Imam of Nigeria, a member of the ADF Steering Committee, gave the opening address and discussed the importance of including women, the poor and minorities in the democratic process. Christopher Landsberg of South Africa, former director of the Centre for Policy Research, gave the keynote address to the participants. The conference also included workshops focusing on various sub-regions of the continent and specific policy areas important to democracy in Africa.

=== Durban, South Africa- 2004 ===
The ADF participated in the Third World Movement for Democracy Assembly in Durban, South Africa in 2004. The regional workshop at the Assembly was divided into three sessions: the overall development of the ADF, a discussion of the ADF constitution, and the election of an ADF Management Committee, formerly the ADF Steering Committee. The Management Committee presented a draft of the ADF Constitution, and at the end of the Assembly the newly created Drafting Committee presented the document to the participants. The draft was accepted as a working document, and participants agreed to continue to discuss the draft over the online listserv before accepting a final version. At the end of the workshop, the participants elected the members of the Management Committee, paying close attention to the gender, regional and linguistic balances of the Committee.

=== Kyiv, Ukraine- 2008 ===
At the Fifth Assembly of the World Movement for Democracy, the Management Committee of the ADF met to review the issues of the operation and management of the organization. The group decided to send the Chair of the Committee to the Secretariat in Nairobi to assess ADF's readiness to address the current challenges facing democracy work in Africa. The Committee used the information gathered to create a strategic plan for the organization for the next three years. The plan identified issues and areas of priority for the ADF, and helped to prioritize the ADF's activities in the upcoming years.

== ADF Constitution ==
After its initial discussion in 2004, the ADF members discussed at length necessary changes to the draft Constitution. The ADF members formally adopted the final version of the document at their meeting in April 2006. The Constitution outlines the structure, membership, and activities of the organization.

== ADF Leadership ==
The ADF is led by a Management Committee, previous called the Steering Committee. The tasks of the Committee are to prioritize ADF activities, to oversee the work of the ADF Secretariat and the ADF coordinator, to provide guidance to the coordinator and Secretariat as necessary, and to assist in fundraising for ADF activities. As stated in the Constitution, Management Committee members are elected by ADF members every two years. The current members of the Management Committee are:

| Dr. Joseph Nkurunziza | Chairperson |
| Djingarey Maiga | Vice Chairperson |
| Kingsley Nneji Bangwell | Secretary |
| Maximilienne C. Ngombe | Treasurer |
| Jean-Robert Ilunga Numbi | Member |
| Terence Chitapi | Member |
| Abdurashid Ali | Member |

- ex officio members by virtue of being an African member of the World Movement for Democracy Steering Committee
