= Sandra Aceng =

Ugandan digital rights advocate

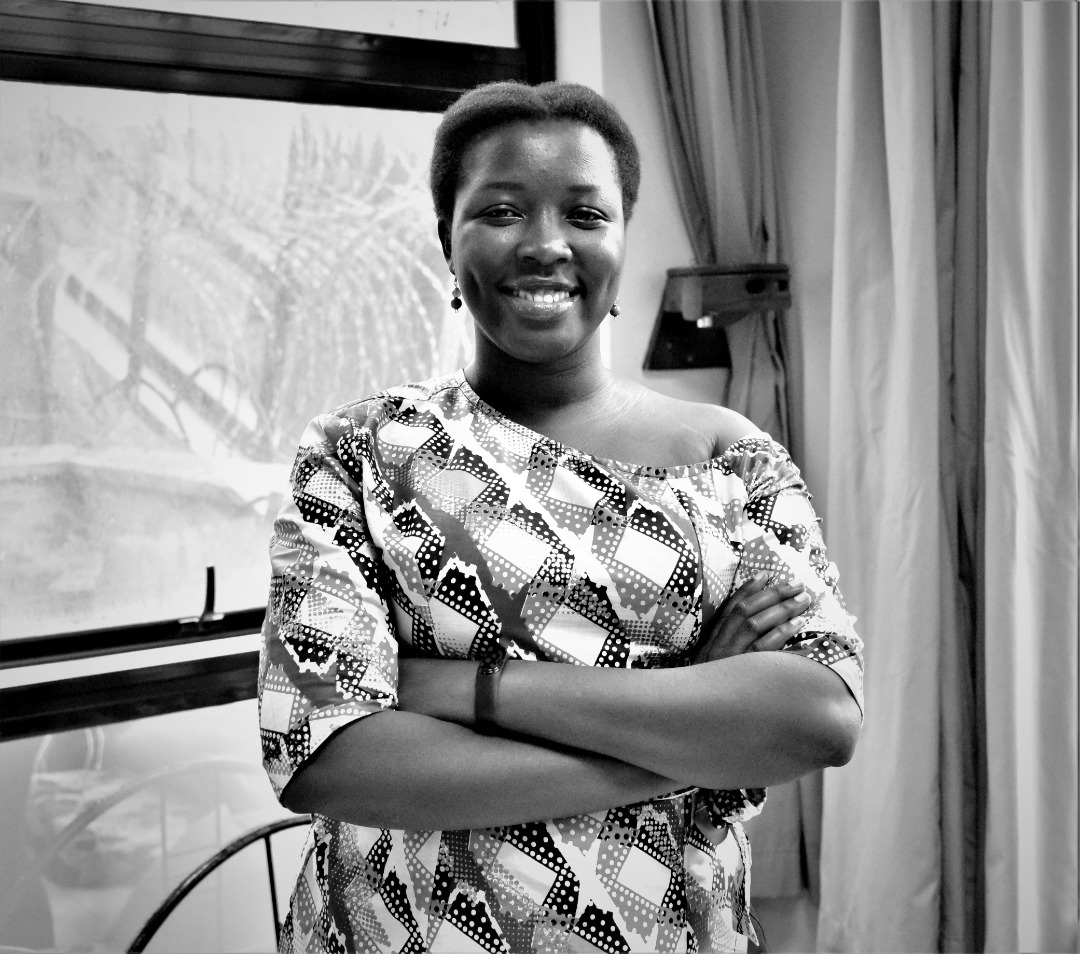
- Sandra Aceng (2022)
- Citizenship: Ugandan
- Education: Makerere University
- Occupation: Digital rights activist
- Employer: Women of Uganda Network (WOUGNET)

Sandra Aceng is a Ugandan digital rights advocate whose work focuses on gender justice, online safety, and inclusive internet governance in Uganda and across Africa. She is the executive director of the Women of Uganda Network (WOUGNET), an organisation that promotes women's use of information and communication technologies for sustainable development.

== Career and advocacy ==
Aceng's work focuses on expanding women's digital access, addressing online harassment, and promoting rights-based internet governance frameworks. She has participated in national and regional internet governance processes, including the Uganda Internet Governance Forum.

She has also taken part in the African School on Internet Governance (AfriSIG), reflecting on digital policy development and knowledge building in Africa. Aceng has engaged in global policy platforms, including participation linked to the World Urban Forum.

== Digital rights and media engagement ==
Aceng has publicly addressed the issue of online harassment targeting women journalists and media practitioners in Uganda. She has also spoken on the mental health challenges faced by journalists working in digital environments. Aceng has participated in discussions on digital rights protections for journalists and activists. She has contributed commentary and reporting to international platforms such as Global Voices. She has also appeared in interviews discussing the importance of open, free, and secure internet access for women.

== Community digital inclusion ==
Through her association with WOUGNET, Aceng has been involved in initiatives aimed at strengthening women's internet accessibility at the district level, including digital inclusion and digital empowerment efforts in Oyam District.

== Gender justice and human rights ==
Aceng has also contributed to research and advocacy initiatives focused on countering backlash against gender justice in Uganda. She was profiled as a woman human rights defender for her work on gender and digital rights.
