= WOUGNET =

Non-governmental organization in Uganda

- Women of Uganda Network
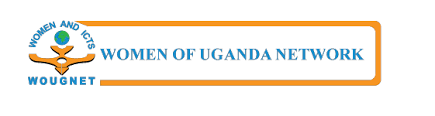
- Abbreviation: WOUGNET
- Formation: May 2000
- Founder: Dorothy Okello
- Founded at: Kampala, Central Region
- Purpose: To develop the use of information and communication technologies (ICTs) among women as tools to share information and address issues collectively.
- Headquarters: Kampala, Uganda
- Location: Uganda
- Region served: East Africa
- Members: 30
- Executive Director: Sandra Aceng
- Board of directors: Angela Nakafeero; Peace Musiimenta; Ednah Karamagi; Julie Agum; James Oriekot; Fridah Mutesi; Shubey Nantege Luzinda
- Staff: 18
- Website: https://wougnet.org/

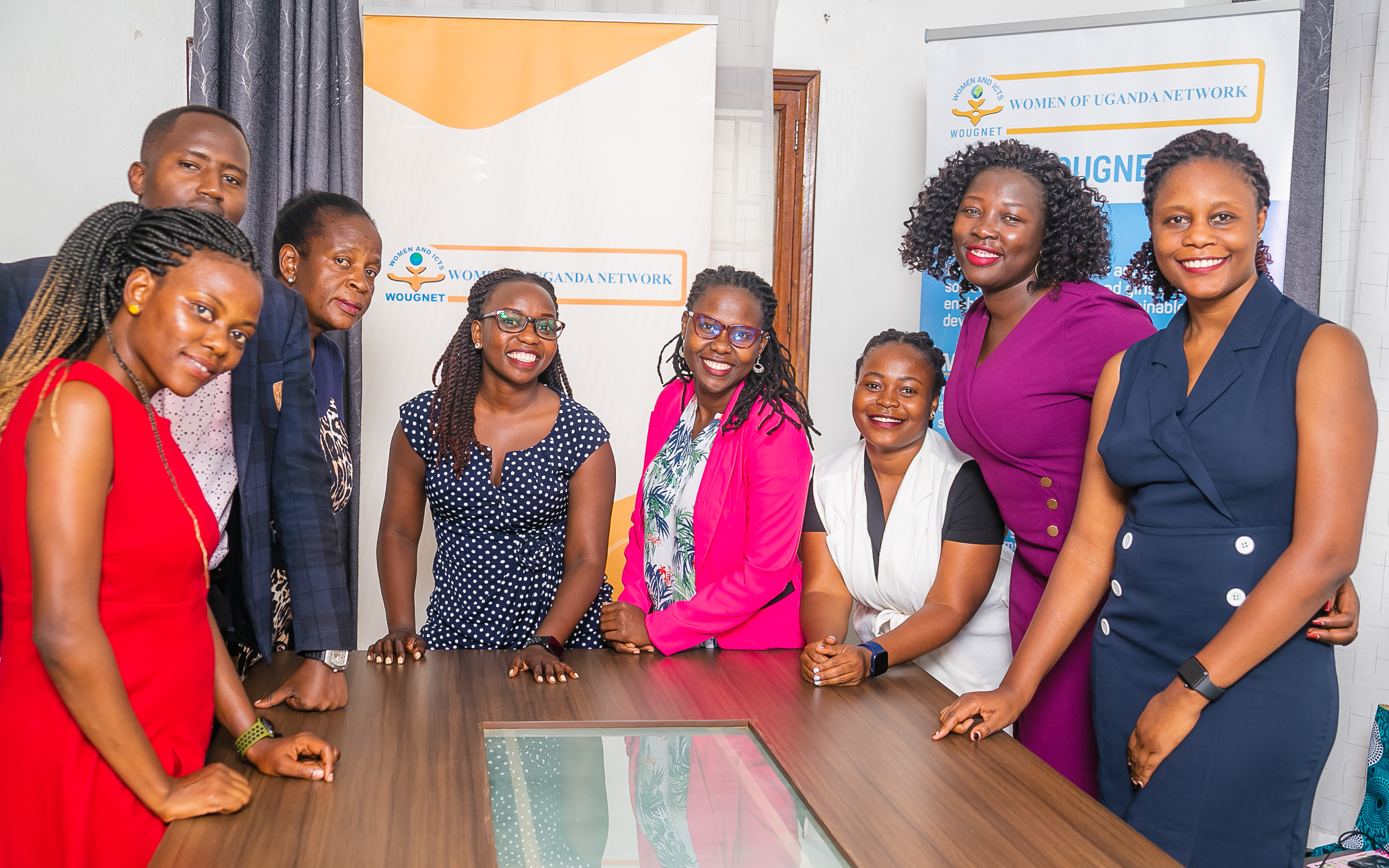
WOUGNET staff at the secretariat

Women of Uganda Network (WOUGNET) also known as Women of Uganda Network Development Limited is Ugandan non-governmental organization that aids women and women's organisations in the use and access of information and communication technologies (ICTs) to share information and address issues their concerns such as gender norms, advocating for their rights and building communities and businesses through education.

== History ==
WOUGNET was founded in May 2000 by women's organisations from Uganda. Its mailing lists are hosted by Kabissa.

Mission: To promote the use of information and communication technologies by women and girls for gender equality and sustainable development.

Aim: To improve the conditions of life for Ugandan women, by enhancing their capacities and opportunities for exchange, collaboration and information sharing.

Vision: An inclusive and just society where women and girls are enabled to use ICTs for sustainable development.

Programs: Information Sharing and Networking, Technical Support, and Gender and ICT Policy Advocacy.

WOUGNET does research and analysis on internet and ICT policies, promotes equal access to information, intersection of gender and technology, capacity building on online safety and emerging technology trends among other activities to ensure that women are catered for in them. It also implements other programs in agriculture, digital inclusion, entrepreneurship, governance and accountability among other programs.

== Executive directors ==
1. Dorothy Okello (Founder)
2. Peace Oliver Amuge (May 2020 to February 2023).
3. Sandra Aceng from March 2023 to date.

== Memberships ==
WOUGNET is a member of;

- ICT4Democracy (ICT4D) network
- Women's Rights Online (WRO) network spearheaded by World Wide Web Foundation.
- Association for Progressive Communications (APC) since January 2005.
- Girls Not Brides since 25 March 2012.
- The Global Network Initiative (GNI) since 2019.
- Digital Human Rights Lab since 2019.
- Uganda Women's Network.
- Forum for Agricultural Research in Africa (RUFORUM).

== Tools ==
WOUGNET uses email, social media, the web, SMS (short messaging service) and "traditional means" such as radio, television and print media such as newspapers to communicate and share information about online gender based violence (OGBV), online safety among other issues.

== Awards ==
Democracy Innovation Award (2013): In 2013, WOUGNET was awarded the Winner Of The Democracy Innovation at the closing ceremony of the second World Forum for Democracy held in Strasbourg. The Innovation Award recognized the efforts taken to involve citizens in democratic processes and the general public life.

World Summit Award (2003): WOUGNET received the World Summit Award in the "Inclusion & Empowerment" category, acknowledging its efforts to empower women through ICTs.

2024 award for championing the women in ICT agenda in Uganda.

== Members ==
WOUGNET has no membership fees for its three types of memberships and these are individual, organisation (Women organisations based in Uganda) and affiliate (organisations that are not women organisations based in Uganda). To become a member you have to are required to subscribe to the WOUGNET mailing list.

WOUGNET members include:

- Reach out Wives of Soldiers’ Association (ROWOSA)
- Slum Aid Project (SAP)
- Ibanda Women's Guild (IWOGU)
- Gabula Atudde Women Group (GABULA ATUDDE)
- Tusubira Women's Group (TUWOGRO)
- Warm Hearts Foundation (WHF)
- Katosi Women Development Trust (KWDT)
- Ntulume Village Women Development Association (NVIWODA)
- Uganda Women Entrepreneurs Association (UWEAL)
- Comfort Community Empowerment Network (COCENET)
- Local Sustainable Communities Organizations (LOSCO)
- St Bruno Doll Making Group
- Hope Case Foundation (HCF)
- Kigezi Women in Development (KWID)
- Uganda Muslim Women Vision (UMWV)
- Grassroots Women's Association for Development (GWAD)
- Disabled Women in Development (DIWODE)
- Karma Rural Women's Development Organization (KRUWODO)
- Community action for sustainable livelihood (CASUL)

== Awards and recognistions ==
- Inclusion & Empowerment by World Summit Award (WSA) in 2003.
- Democracy Innovation Award by The council of Europe at World Forum for Democracy in 2013.

== Activities, campaigns, workshops and trainings ==
In 2005, WOUGNET registered Ugandans who would attend the World Summit on Information Society (WSIS) that happened in Tunis in Tunisia.

WOUGNET partnered with Womensnet, South Africa and APC-Africa-Women (AAW) and ran an SMS based 16 Days of Activism campaign where messages against violence against women were sent out by both individuals and organisations.

WOUGNET partnered with Internews and trained Civil Society organisations (CSOs) and Human Rights Defenders (HRDs) that wanted to strengthen advocacy strategies for women's rights and privacy online.

WOUGNET engaged policymakers, government agencies, CSOs and lawmakers to better understand how cybercrime legislation, data protection, access to information among other issues affected women.

== Projects and reports ==
=== Reports ===
some of the reports include;

- Bridging the Digital Gender Gap in Uganda: An Assessment of Women Rights Online Based on the Principles of the African Declaration of Internet Rights and Freedoms (AFDEC) which addressed women's internet usage performance in Uganda.

=== WOUGNET's current, present and past projects include ===
- Civil Society in Uganda Digital Support Programme (CUSDS) supported by the Women Peace and Humanitarian Fund which responded to COVID-19 emergency in Uganda by strengthening the institutional digital capacity of her 23 member organisations in 2020 to remain resilient during a situation where COVID-19 erected roadblocks and restrictions on movement of staff.
- Women's Rights Online Media Campaigns in Uganda supported by Association for Progressive Communications (APC) in 2020 under All Women Count Project.
- Enhancing Women's Rights Online through Inclusive and effective response to online gender-based violence in Uganda. supported by Digital Human Rights Lab in 2021.
- Our Voices, Our Futures (OVOF) funded by Association for Progressive Communications (APC) from 2021 to 2025.
- Saving Women's Journalists from Online harassment in Uganda by Improving Legislation on Freedom of Expression in the Digital Spaces and Tackling Online harassment (SWIFT) supported by Urgent Action Funds in 2021.
- Promoting Smart Policy Options in Closing Gender Digital Divide in Uganda, in partnership with CfMA supported by World Wide Web Foundation in 2020–2021.
- Strengthening Uganda's Rights to Freedom of Expression through Policy Advocacy and Media (SURFACE) supported by International Centre for Not-for-Profit Law (ICNL) in 2021.
- Marker-Assisted Breeding of selected Native Chickens in Mozambique and Uganda in partnership with Eduardo Mondlane Mozambique, Makerere University, Gulu University and International Rural Poultry Centre- Kyeema Foundation (Mozambique) supported by African Union from 2019 to 2022.
- Strengthening use of ICTs and social media for Citizen Engagement and improved Service Delivery supported by SIDA in Eastern and Indigo Trust UK in Northern Uganda.
- Strengthening use of ICTs and Social media for citizen engagement and improved service delivery, funded by Indigo Trust UK.
- Increasing women's decision making and influence in Internet Governance and ICT policy for the realization of women's rights in Africa, implemented with WomensNet in Uganda and South Africa and supported by UN Women Fund for Gender Equality

== See also ==
- Association for Progressive Communications
- Global Network Initiative
- Dorothy Okello
