= Citizens Foundation =

The Citizens Foundation is a non-profit organization based in Reykjavík, Iceland, and founded under Icelandic law to promote electronic collaborative democracy around the globe and to develop the software needed for that purpose. The organization got its start when citizens were asked to crowdsource their constitution in 2010. In 2013 the foundation created the award-winning platform Better Reykjavík in collaboration with the Best party.

== History ==
Its formation can be traced back to the Icelandic financial crash in 2008 when development of the software started although the Foundation itself wasn't formally founded until 2010. The main focus has been on developing a web based democracy tool called Open Active Democracy (OAD) which it uses for its democracy building projects which are: Better Reykjavík, Shadow Parliament (Iceland only) and the international project Your Priorities.

== Projects ==
Shadow Parliament (Skuggaþing) opened formally in February 2010, imports all proposals from the Icelandic Parliament (Alþingi) and enables citizens to choose which proposals they support or oppose as well as allowing them to put forward their own proposals. The system received acclaim from the Icelandic blogosphere and over 2,000 citizens took part in using the system, including by individual members of the Parliament.

A few months later, on 25 May 2010, the website Shadow City (Skuggaborg) opened, a few days before the municipal elections in Icelands capital, Reykjavík with all parties running in the election given their own section for promotion and usage. The website was received with acclaim by the Best Party whose supporters used it extensively for their proposals and ideas. The Best Party won the elections and started majority negotiations with the Social Democratic Alliance. The parties asked the founders of Skuggaborg to create a special area on the website called Better Reykjavík for the citizens to help them create a majority agreement. In 3 days the number of users had reached almost 3.000 with over 400 ideas and 873 points for and against those ideas. One news site referred to this as "A flood of ideas about a Better Reykjavík". In their majority agreement the parties said: The website Better Reykjavík will be used as support in decision making and policy formulation and the city has been working with the Citizens Foundation in opening a new and improved version of Better Reykjavík that will be used as an integral part of the city's governance.

This success prompted the Young Social Democrats (the youth movement related to the Social Democratic Alliance) to challenge the government to implement a similar system for the country.

Some of the ideas from Better Reykjavík have already been put into practice, one of them is a proposal to keep one swimmingpool open 24/7 for 1–2 months in the summer. This was realized two months after the election in the biggest swimmingpool in Reykjavík, Laugardalslaugin although the pool was only open continuously for a week.

After Better Reykjavík the Citizens Foundation team, Róbert Bjarnason, Gunnar Grímsson and Óskar J. Sandholt started focusing on the Foundation's international effort, Your Priorities, which includes a website like Better Reykjavík for every country in the world, free of charge.

== See also ==
- Civic technology
- Deliberative democracy
- Open-source governance
- Wiki survey
