= Loomio =

Decision-making software

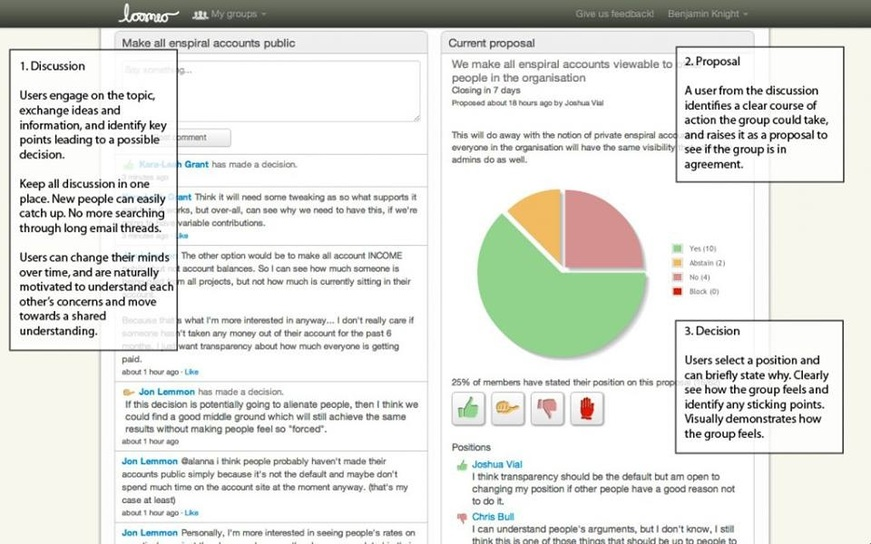
- 2014 Loomio interface elaboration
- Stable release: 3.0.5 / 7 September 2025; 13 months ago
- Written in: Ruby, JavaScript
- Platform: web
- License: AGPL v3
- Website: www.loomio.org
- Repository: github.com/loomio/loomio

Loomio is decision-making software and web service designed to assist groups with collaborative, consensus-focused decision-making processes. It is a free software web application, where users can initiate discussions and put up proposals. As the discussions progress to initiating a proposal, the group receives feedback through an updatable pie chart or other data visualizations. Loomio is basically a web based forum (has optional email delivery interface) with tools to facilitate conversations and decision-making processes from starting and holding conversations to reaching outcome.

Loomio was built by a small core group of developers, based out of Wellington, New Zealand. Most of the work was made by this core group but more than 70 contributors from around the world participated occasionally with small contribution.

In 2014, Loomio raised over $100,000 via a Crowdfunding effort to develop Loomio 1.0. The Loomio web interface supports mobile access and other enhancements. As of 2016, Loomio was used by over 20,000 groups in more than 100 countries, with the software translated into 35 languages.

== History ==
Loomio emerged from the Occupy movement. In 2012, it launched its first prototype. It was utilized in the Occupy movement in New Zealand. After using the first prototype in this, the team behind Loomio felt that it would be easier to give everyone a voice with an online software, leading to the launch of Loomio 1.0. Since the launch of Loomio 1.0, Loomio has stopped using occupy hand-signals in the interface. It has since been developed into a social enterprise as Loomio Cooperative Limited that is a platform cooperative.

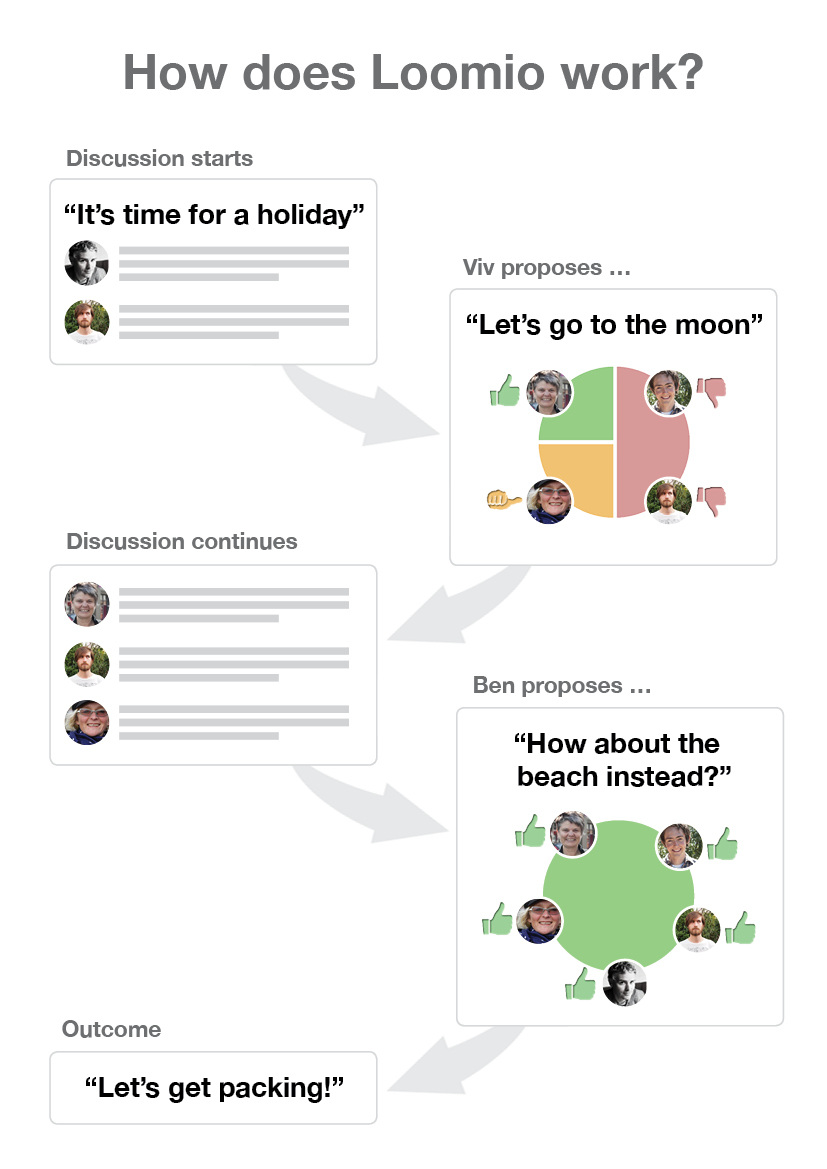
How Loomio works as diagram

== Funding ==
Loomio says it is funded through contracts with government and business, and donations from its users.

== Product Overview ==
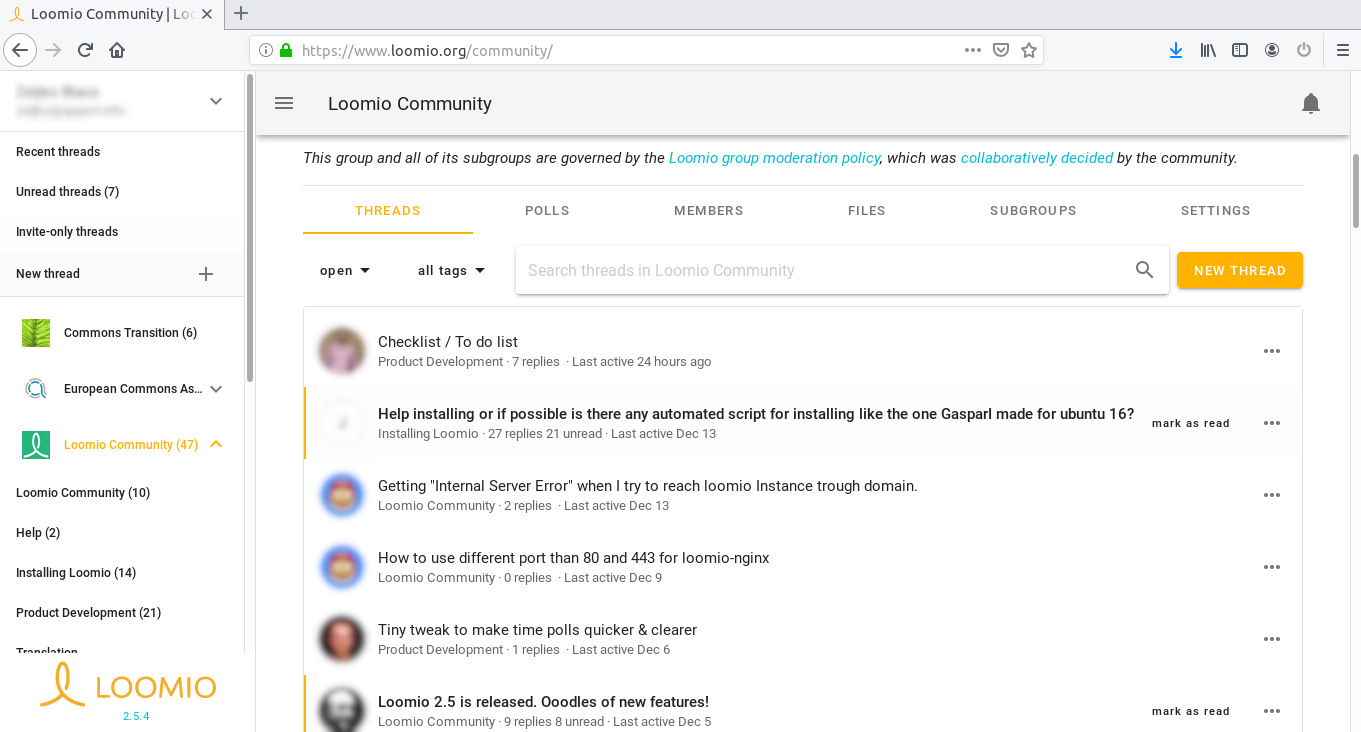
LOOMIO 2.5.4 discussion view

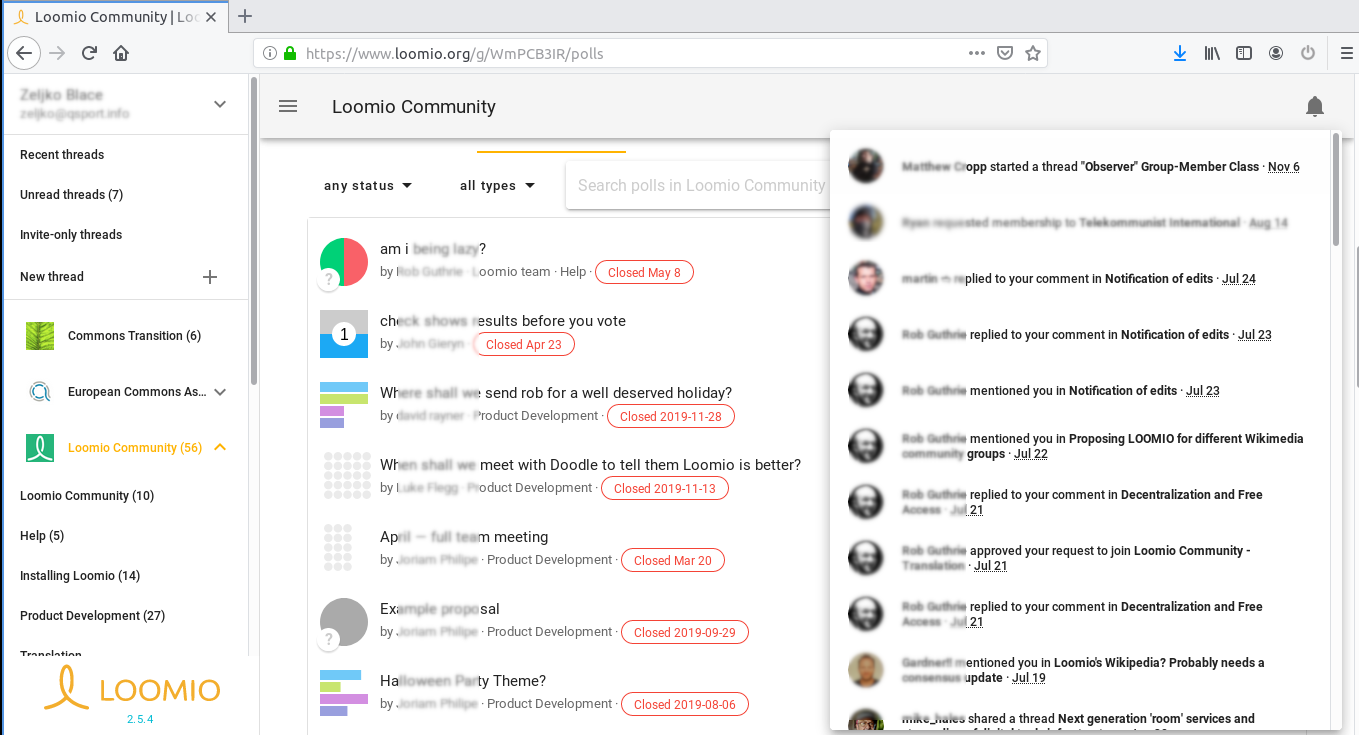
LOOMIO polls & notifications

=== EU specific ===
Loomio has committed to address the needs and regulations of the EU market. In 2018 the EU General Data Protection Regulation (GDPR) came into effect and Loomio confirmed that it is GDPR compliant. In 2019 Loomio started planning a Loomio.eu service to use EU based hosting in response to requests from EU users.

=== Integrations ===
Recent versions include more features of integration with other software. It is possible to connect Loomio group notifications to Slack, Microsoft Teams and Mattermost. It is also possible to add a Single Sign On (SSO) using central authentication provider like Microsoft Azure Active Directory.

== Projects using Loomio ==
Prominent projects that have used Loomio for collaborative work based on democratic process:

- 2013: Wellington City Council
- 2013: Diaspora
- 2014: Real democracy
- 2015: Podemos (Spanish political party)
- 2016: Students for Cooperation
- 2016: New England Institute of Technology
- 2019: OpenStreetMap Foundation
- 2020: The Apache Software Foundation as of early 2020
- 2020: Consultative Council (Poland)
- 2020: Pirate Party of Belgium
- 2022: Igalia
- 2023: ICCA Consortium
- 2025: OpenSSL
- 2025: New York City Democratic Socialists of America
- 2025: World Resources Institute

=== Research projects ===
- 2018: Wild DNA
- 2019: Genomics Research and Involving People
- 2022: Core Outcome Measures for Improving Care (COM-IC) project

== See also ==
- Collaborative software
- Decidim
- Deliberative democracy
- E-democracy
- E-participation
- Online consultation
- Online deliberation
- Public sphere
- Wiki survey
