= Ernad Deni Čomaga =

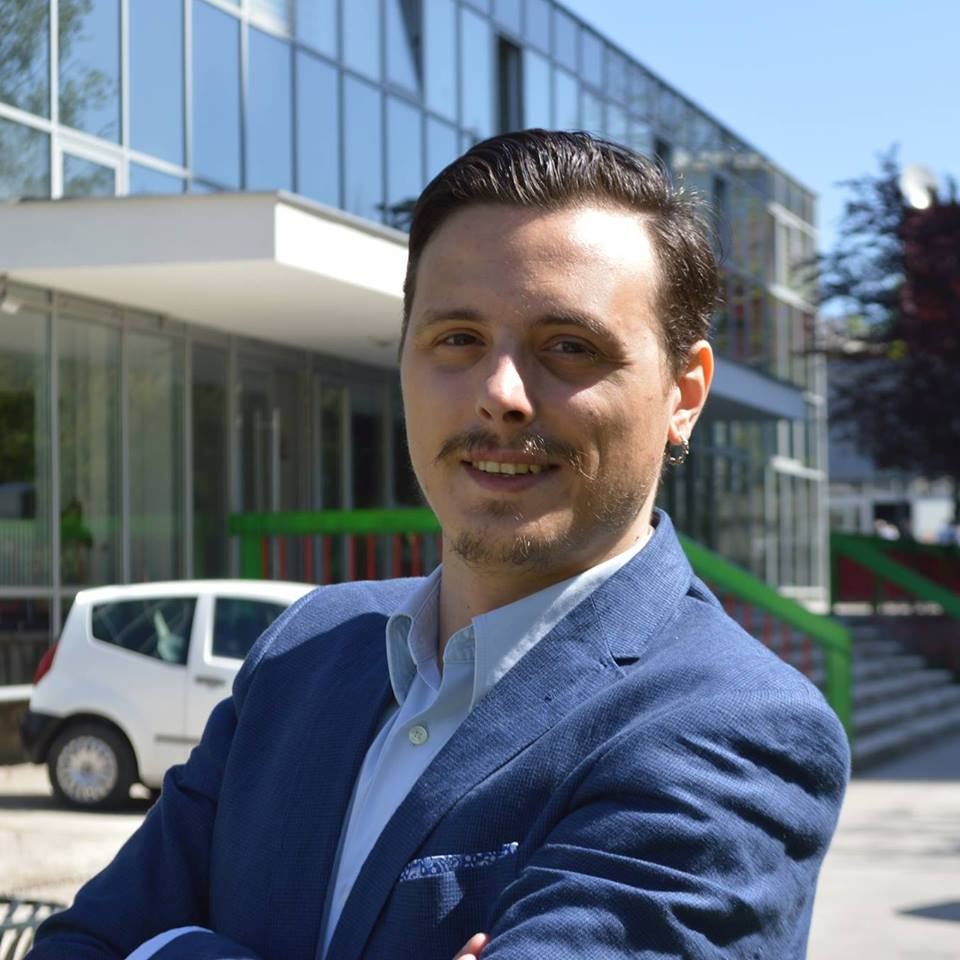
- President of the Democratic Youth Movement

Personal details
- Born: 8 August 1986 (age 40) Sarajevo, Bosnia and Herzegovina
- Education: University of Sarajevo, University of Heidelberg, Humbold University Berlin, Goethe University

Ernad Deni Čomaga is a youth activist, lawyer and social entrepreneur in Bosnia and Herzegovina. He was the acting president and founder of the Democratic Youth Movement, former president of the Law student Association of the University in Sarajevo and president of the law consulting office "Paragaf"

== Biography ==
He was born in 1986 in Sarajevo the capital of the Socialist Republic of Bosnia and Herzegovina and was one of the Children surviving the siege of Sarajevo by fleeing out of Sarajevo and moving to Germany. He was educated in Germany and Bosnia and Herzegovina and is alumni of the Faculty of Law of the University of Sarajevo Humbold University Berlin, Goethe University and the Heidelberg University Faculty of Law.

In 2005 he set the ideological foundation for the NGO Democratic Youth Movement and together with other students from the University of Sarajevo he founded the organization, that will later create impact in the democratization process of Bosnia and Herzegovina. He initiated the organization of two big anti-war protest in Sarajevo, by protesting against the war in Lebanon in 2006 and the war in Gaza in 2009. In 2010 he started the project "My 2010" with the goal to educate and motivate 12000 young voters from 18 to 22 years of age to vote in the upcoming elections in Bosnia and Herzegovina. By implementing this project the organization created the impact that will later lead to the change of government in Bosnia and Herzegovina. This project was repeated in the general elections in 2014 in Bosnia and Herzegovina where they managed to educate 8000 secondary school students on voting issues.

One of the most important activities of the organization was the petition to force the government of Bosnia and Herzegovina to participate in the Erasmus plus program of the European Union. Together with other members of the organization they managed to collect more than 8000 signatures and create media pressure on the government so that they later succeed with the petition.

Later he also succeed with another petition to ban reality shows to be screened during the primetime in Bosnia and Herzegovina.

He holds two Master of laws degrees from the University of Heidelberg and Goethe University.

In his career he was speaker at some international conferences and forums.
