= Decidim =

Participatory democracy software

Decidim (sociopolitical network)
- Established: 2016 (10 years ago)
- Types: organization
- Aim: participatory democracy
- Affiliations: City Council of Barcelona
- Website: decidim.org

Decidim (software)
- Stable release: 0.32.1 / 30 July 2026
- Written in: Ruby on Rails
- License: software: GNU AGPLv3; content: CC BY-SA; data: Open Database License
- Website: Official website
- Repository: github.com/decidim/decidim

Decidim describes itself as a "technopolitical network for participatory democracy". It combines a free and open-source software (FOSS) software package together with a participatory political project and an organising community, "Metadecidim". Decidim participants describe the software, political and organising components as "technical", "political" and "technopolitical" levels, respectively. Decidim's aims can be seen as promoting the right to the city, as proposed by Henri Lefebvre. As of 2023, Decidim instances were actively in use for participatory decision-making in municipal and regional governments and by citizens' associations in Spain, Switzerland and elsewhere in Europe. Studies of the use of Decidim found that it was effective in some cases, while in one case implemented top-down in Lucerne, it strengthened the digital divide.

== Creation ==
A server called "Decidim" was created by the 15M anti-austerity movement in Spain in 2016, running a fork of the "Consul" software, when a political party derived from the protest movement obtained political power. In early 2017, the server was switched to a similarly inspired, but new software project, Decidim, completely rewritten, aiming to be more modular and convenient for development by a wide community.

Founded in Barcelona, the name "Decidim" comes from a Catalan word meaning "let's decide" or "we decide". Privacy and citizen-ownership of data was a key motivator to improve discussion and engagement that had previously been happening on social media.

== Software ==
Decidim uses Ruby on Rails. As of 2022, the software defines two structures: "participatory spaces" and "participatory components". The participatory spaces (six as of early 2024) include "processes" (such as a participatory budget), "assemblies" (such as a citizens' association website), "conferences/meetings", "initiatives", and "consultations (voting/elections)". The participatory components (twelve as of early 2024) range from "comments", "proposals", "amendments", "votes" through to "accountability". Together these allow a wide flexibility in creating specific space–component combinations. The "accountability" component is used to monitor whether and how a project is executed.

As of 2022, three user levels are defined: general visitors with view-only access; registered users who have several participation rights; and verified users who can participate in decision-making. Users may be individuals or represent associations or working groups within an organisation. Users with special privileges are called "administrators", "moderators" and "collaborators".

As of 2022, four versions of Decidim had been released.

The Decidim software development strategy is intended to be modular and scalable. As FOSS, the software is intended to encourage both citizen and government interaction with each other and with decision-making power over the software itself, aiming at high levels of traceability and transparency.

Decidim software provides an application programming interface (API) for command line access.

== Technopolitical project ==
In the spirit of the Decidim software being free and open-source software (FOSS), a community of software developers, social activists, software consultancies, researchers, and administrative staff from municipal governments called Metadecidim was created for discussing and analysing Decidim experience and development. Metadecidim is seen as an intermediary component between the political level of Decidim, implemented on servers such as Barcelona Decidim, and the technical level of hosting the software source code and bug reporting structures. As of June 2023, Metadecidim had about 5000 registered participants.

The Decidim community has a text called the Decidim Social Contract (DSC) that defines six guidelines. The DSC defines the free software licenses that may be used for Decidim software; it defines requirements of transparency, traceability and integrity of content hosted by Decidim software; a goal of equal access to all users and democratic quality parameters to measure progress towards equality; data privacy; and it requires inter-institutional cooperation of institutions implementing instances of the software, in order to encourage further development. The free software licensing is the GNU Affero General Public License (AGPL) version 3 for code; the CC BY-SA licence is used for content; and "data" is published under the Open Database License.

Philosophically, the aims of Decidim can be seen as promoting the right to the city, as proposed by Henri Lefebvre. Metadecidim's self-description as "technopolitical" is seen as implying that the political implications of designs and choices of software are seen as significant, in opposition to the view that software is "value neutral and objective". Metadecidim sees Decidim as a "recursively democratic infrastructure", in the sense that the software, political and server infrastructure is "both used and democratised by its community, the Metadecidim community".

Decidim proponents see the combination of online and offline participation as fundamental: "From its very conception until today, a distinguishing feature of Decidim over other kinds of participatory democracy software ... was that of connecting digital processes directly with public meetings and vice versa."

Organisationally, the community formally established Decidim Association in 2019 and City Council of Barcelona gave control of the Decidim trademark and code base to Decidim Association. The effect was to combine public funds with citizens' association control of decision-making.

== Use of Decidim ==
In 2022, Borge and colleagues estimated that there were 311 instances running Decidim in Spain and in 19 other countries; while Borges and colleagues estimated that there were Decidim instances run by 80 local and regional governments and 40 citizens' associations in Spain and elsewhere. In 2023, Suter and colleagues cited Decidim's own estimate of 400 city and regional governments and civil society institutions using Decidim. The Open University of Catalonia, the University of Bordeaux and the University of Caen Normandy ran Decidim instances.

=== Decidim Barcelona ===
A Decidim server was run by the City Council of Barcelona for a two-month trial prior to 2017, in which 40,000 citizens discussed their own proposals and proposals made by the council. The Decidim software allowed threaded discussion, labelling whether the initial comment on a proposal was negative, neutral or positive, and notification to participants.

The two-month trial included both online and face-to-face participation. According to Decidim, about 40% of the 39,000 individual participants did so face-to-face, and about 85% of the organisational participants did so face-to-face. There were about 11,000 proposals made on the Decidim server, of which about 8000 were accepted. The execution of the proposals was monitored during the following four years, spending about 90% of the Barcelona City Council's budget for 2016–2019.

=== Zurich and Lucerne ===
In Switzerland, urban development has legal requirements in relation to citizen participation. Use of Decidim in Zurich and Lucerne in 2021 and 2022 was studied by Suter and colleagues, based on documentary evidence, interviews with 15 people in Zurich and 17 in Lucerne ranging from municipality employees through to representatives of neighbourhood associations, and "participatory observations" (informal participatory events observed by the researchers). The researchers found that the effectiveness of Decidim varied significantly between the different cases, and argued that the "full potential" of Decidim had not yet been achieved in Switzerland.

In Wipkingen in Zurich, two local citizens' associations used a server running Decidim to run a participatory budget to spend CHF 40,000. The project, named "Quartieridee", had 99 submissions of proposals and awarded funding to eight proposals. The researchers found that overall implementation was dependent on significant financial resources and citizens' voluntary work; and had difficulties due to the municipality lacking legal procedures for implementing the citizens' chosen projects.

The project was scaled up to the Zurich city level the following year with the name "Stadtidee" and a participatory budget of CHF 540,000. Among the successful projects was a confrontation between a citizens' association, "Linkes Seeufer für Alle" opposed to a Kibag AG in relation to a plot of land owned by Kibag next to Lake Zurich. An effect of the Decidim networking was that citizens legally occupied the plot of land for several days.

In 2021, the LuzernNord area of Lucerne was an area with many migrants and people with low incomes, at risk of gentrification. A top-down use of a Decidim server by the local administration, in which citizens' associations were encouraged to participate, was found by the researchers to strengthen the digital divide rather than overcoming it. Limitation of the language to German and lack of confidence in being able to participate effectively were found to be specific effects opposing the effectiveness of the project.

=== Other municipalities ===
Based on nine in-depth interviews with officials responsible for Decidim, conducted in 2018 in some of the initial municipalities that used Decidim, online interviews in March 2019 with officials from 34 municipalities using Decidim, and data from the Decidim servers, the effectiveness of Decidim in terms of transparency, participation in decision-making, and deliberation (discussion of proposals) was studied by Rosa Borge and colleagues. It was found that the officials saw Decidim's role as primarily promoting transparency and the collecting of citizens' proposals, while having only a modest role in transferring decision-making to citizens and a minor role in encouraging online citizen debate.

Several municipalities' use of Decidim provided their first use of participatory budgeting.

The Borge et al. study also found, consistently with other research, that the participatory aspect of citizens making proposals and participating in decisions was obstructed in some cases by local civil society associations, since direct citizen participation was seen to be in competition with the associations' roles. Several municipal governments worked on the implementation of Decidim together with local associations, adding features to the software such as different weightings for proposals by individuals versus those by associations.

The use of Decidim and participatory processes was found to depend on electoral results in some cases: these ceased in Badalona after Dolors Sabater lost power as Mayor in June 2018.

== Recognition ==
In 2023, the Decidim software was recognised as satisfying the criteria of the Digital Public Goods Alliance as a digital public good that contributes to the United Nations' Sustainable Development Goals.

== See also ==
- Technological utopianism (Decidim sees itself as opposed to technological utopianism)
- Wiki survey
