= Community Notes =

Fact-checking feature on X

- Logo of Community Notes on X

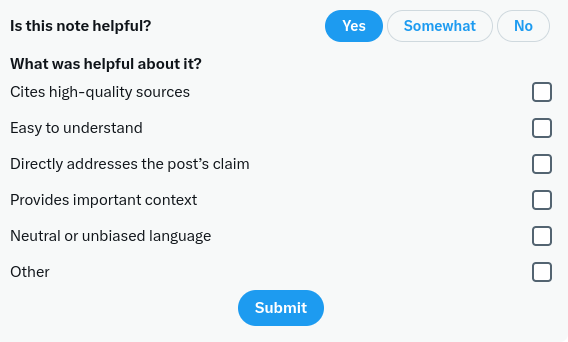
- Rating a Community Note on X
- Other names: Birdwatch
- Original author: Twitter, Inc.
- Developer: X Corp.
- Release: January 25, 2021
- Written in: Python
- Platform: X
- Type: Crowdsourcing; Fact-checking; Content moderation
- License: Apache-2.0 license
- Website: communitynotes.x.com
- Repository: github.com/twitter/communitynotes

Community Notes (formerly known as Birdwatch) is a feature on X (formerly Twitter) where contributors can add context such as fact-checks under a post, image or video. It is a community-driven content moderation program, intended to provide helpful and informative context, based on a crowd-sourced system. Notes are applied to potentially misleading content by a bridging-based algorithm not based on majority rule, but instead agreement from users on different sides of the political spectrum.

The program launched on the platform in 2021 and became widespread in 2023. Initially shown to U.S. users only, notes were popularized in March 2022 over misinformation in the Russian invasion of Ukraine followed by COVID-19 misinformation in October. Birdwatch was then rebranded to Community Notes and expanded in November 2022. As of November 2023, it had approximately 133,000 contributors; notes reportedly receive tens of millions of views per day, with its goal being to counter propaganda and misinformation. According to investigation and studies, the vast majority of users do not see notes correcting content. (Note: Mashable reported noted content views were 5–10 higher than the attached notes. The Center for Countering Digital Hate reported views of misinformation were 13 times higher than attached notes.) In May 2024, a study of COVID-19 vaccine notes were deemed accurate 97% of the time.

Critics have also highlighted how it has spread disinformation, is vulnerable to manipulation, and has been inconsistent in its application of notes, as well as its efforts in combating of misinformation. Some suggest that structurally the system "lacks critical reflection on the potential for content to harm". (Note: Inconsistencies and delays in publishing notes related to the Gaza war: Liles, Jordan (November 13, 2023). "'Verified' Users on X Falsely Claim Video of Hospitalized Palestinian Man and Mother Is 'Fake'". Snopes.; Weatherbed, Jess (October 20, 2023). "Blue checkmarks on X are 'superspreaders of misinformation' about Israel-Hamas war". The Verge.; Goggin, Ben (October 10, 2023). "Elon Musk's fact-checking system delayed Israel corrections for days". NBC News.; Alba, Davey; Lu, Denise; Yin, Leon; Fan, Eric (November 21, 2023). "How Musk's X Is Failing To Stem the Surge of Misinformation About Israel and Gaza". Bloomberg.com. Archived from the original on November 21, 2023.) Elon Musk, the owner of X, considers the program as a game changer and having considerable potential. However, after a post by Musk received a Community Note, he claimed the program had been manipulated by state actors.

== History ==
The original logo of Birdwatch

In February 2020, Twitter began introducing labels and warning messages intended to limit potentially harmful and misleading content. In August 2020, development of Birdwatch was announced, initially described as a moderation tool. Twitter first launched the Birdwatch program in January 2021, intended as a way to debunk misinformation and propaganda, with a pilot program of 1,000 contributors, weeks after the January 6 United States Capitol attack. The aim was to "build Birdwatch in the open, and have it shaped by the Twitter community." In November 2021, Twitter updated the Birdwatch moderation tool to limit the visibility of contributors' identities by creating aliases for their accounts, in an attempt to limit bias towards the author of notes.

Twitter then expanded access to notes made by the Birdwatch contributors in March 2022, giving a randomized set of US users the ability to view notes attached to tweets and rate them, with a pilot of 10,000 contributors. On average, contributors were noting 43 times a day in 2022 prior to the Russian invasion of Ukraine. This then increased to 156 on the day of the invasion, estimated to be a very small portion of the misleading posts on the platform. By March 1, only 359 of 10,000 contributors had proposed notes in 2022, while a Twitter spokeswoman described plans to scale up the program, with the focus on "ensuring that Birdwatch is something people find helpful and can help inform understanding".

By September 2022, the program had expanded to 15,000 users. In October 2022, the most commonly published notes were related to COVID-19 misinformation based on historical usage. In November 2022, at the request of new owner Elon Musk, Birdwatch was rebranded to Community Notes, taking an open-source approach to deal with misinformation, and expanded to Europe and countries outside of the US.

Community Notes was then extended to include notes on misleading images in May 2023 and in September 2023 further extended to videos, but only for a group of power-users referred to as "Top Writers". Twitter subsequently ended the ability to report misleading posts, instead relying exclusively on Community Notes, with contributors proposing over 21,200 notes on the platform.

In October 2023, Elon Musk announced that posts "corrected" by Community Notes would no longer be eligible for ad revenue in order to "maximize the incentive for accuracy over sensationalism" and in order to discourage the spread of misinformation and disinformation on the platform. The move was criticised by some users and applauded by others. As of November 2023, it has expanded to over 50 countries, with approximately 133,000 contributors.

In November 2024, Musk said "Community Notes is awesome. Everybody gets checked. Including me." In December 2024, he wrote that Community Notes' "system is completely decentralized and open source, both code and data. Any manipulation would show up like a neon sore thumb!" Musk argued in February 2025 that Community Notes "is increasingly being gamed by governments & legacy media", and that he was taking steps to "fix" it. The statement came after his own claims on astronauts and legacy media were contradicted by Community Notes, with Musk describing the Community Note on the astronauts as false and the Community Note vanishing within a week. Musk's February statement also claimed that Ukrainian President Volodymyr Zelenskyy "is despised by the people of Ukraine", after Community Notes contradicted claims that Zelenskyy was unpopular among Ukrainians.

In January 2025, Mark Zuckerberg announced that Meta will remove fact-checkers for Facebook, Instagram, and Threads, replacing them with a community-orientated system, similar to Community Notes. According to Meta, the feature will initially be launched for U.S. users.

== Operation ==
The Community Notes algorithm publishes notes based on agreement from contributors who have a history of disagreeing. Rather than based on majority rule, the program's algorithm prioritizes notes that receive ratings from a "diverse range of perspectives". For a note to be published, a contributor must first propose a note under a tweet. The program assigns different values to contributors' ratings, categorising users with similar rating histories as a form of "opinion classification", determined by a vague alignment with the left- and right-wing political spectrum. The bridging-based machine-learning algorithm requires ratings from both sides of the spectrum in order to publish notes, that can have the intended effect of decreasing interaction with such content.

Contributors are volunteers with access to an interface from which they have the ability to monitor tweets and replies that may be misleading. Notes in need of ratings by contributors are located under a "Needs your help" section of the interface. Other contributors then give their opinion on the usefulness of the note, identifying notes as "Helpful" or "Not Helpful". The contributor gets points if their note is validated, known as "Rating Impact", that reflects how helpful a contributors' ratings have been. X users are able to vote on whether they find notes helpful or not, but must apply to become contributors in order to write notes, the latter being restricted by "Rating Impact" as well as the Community Notes guidelines.

== Application ==
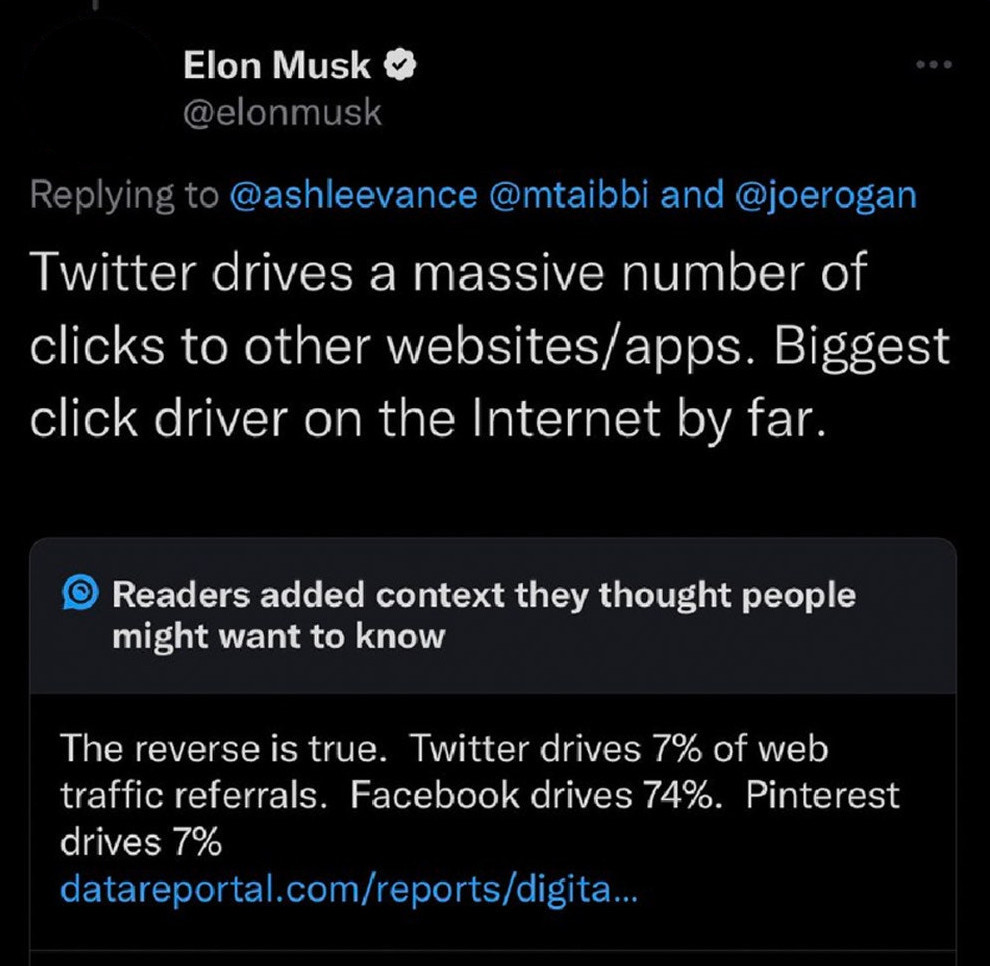
Elon Musk receives a Community Note, November 12, 2022

Since 2023, Community Notes are often attached to shared articles missing context, misleading advertisements or political tweets with false arguments, from content receiving widespread attention.

Notes have appeared on posts by government accounts and various politicians: the White House, the Federal Bureau of Investigation, and U.S. President Joe Biden; UK Prime Ministers Rishi Sunak and Liz Truss; former U.S. speakers of the House and presidential candidates Ron DeSantis and Vivek Ramaswamy; U.S. representatives, senators, and Australian ministers; as well as X owner Elon Musk multiple times, that in February 2024 led to Musk arguing with the program.

The feature does not directly mention fact-checking but instead indicates that "readers added context". They can also note when an image is digitally altered or AI-generated. X allows contributors to add Community Notes to adverts, which the Financial Times noted was good for consumers but not for advertisers. This resulted in brands such as Apple, Samsung, Uber and Evony receiving notes on their adverts and being accused of false or misleading posts, advertisers deleting certain posts that received notes, as well as modifying content for future advertisements.

A source is attached to the note so the information can be verified, in a similar manner to Wikipedia, and notes reportedly received tens of millions of views per day. Elon Musk, the owner of X, considers the program as a "gamechanger for combating wrong information" and having "incredible potential for improving information accuracy". In December 2023, after receiving a note on one of his posts, Musk thanked contributors for "jumping in the honey pot" after stating that the system had been "gamed by state actors", with the intent of detecting so-called bad actors.

In July 2024, as part of a pilot program, X announced the ability for eligible users to request Community Notes for certain posts, that would be directed to "Top Writers" of the software. The threshold of five requests within 24 hours would determine a note being published.

== Analysis ==
The former head of Twitter's Trust and Safety, Yoel Roth, has since expressed concern over the effectiveness of the system in the early stages of the program, stating that Birdwatch was never supposed to replace the curation team, but instead intended to complement it. Another former employee said it was "an imperfect replacement for Trust and Safety staff". In April 2022, a study presented by MIT researchers subsequently found users overwhelmingly prioritised political content, even though 80% were correctly considered misleading.

Wired noted that in the backend of the database most notes remain unpublished, and that numerous contributors engage in "conspiracy-fueled" discussions. According to Musk, anyone trying to "weaponize Community Notes to demonetize people will be immediately obvious", due to the open-source nature of the code and data.

Regarding the situation in Israel and Gaza, with the difficulty of identifying accurate information and the number of unknown factors, MIT professor David Rand said "what I expect the crowd to produce is a lot of noise", regarding the crowd-sourced system. A contributor otherwise described that the system is "not really scalable for the amount of media that's being consumed or posted in any given day", while X states that the program is having a "significant impact on tackling disinformation on the platform".

== Studies ==
In October 2023, Community Notes experienced multi-day delays in publishing notes on misinformation in the Gaza war or failed to do so. One study by NBC News found that in the case of a fake White House press release claiming the destruction of the St. Porphyrius Orthodox Church – a week before the destruction – only 8% of posts had notes published, 26% had unpublished notes, while the majority had no proposed notes. Analysis from NewsGuard of 250 of the most-engaged posts, spreading the most common unsubstantiated claims about the Gaza war and viewed more than 100 million times, failed to receive notes 68% of the time. The report found Community Notes were "inconsistently applied to top myths relating to the conflict." The fact-checking website Snopes discovered three posts from verified users, who had shared a video of a hospitalized man from Gaza with false captions claiming it showed "crisis actors", had failed to receive any Community Notes after 24 hours. Bellingcat found the program spread false information, in reference to Taylor Swift's bodyguard due to misinformation. Wired has documented that Community Notes is susceptible to disinformation, after a graphic Hamas video shared by Donald Trump Jr. was falsely flagged as being a year old, but was instead found to be part of the recent conflict. The original note was later replaced with another citing the report from Wired.

In November 2023, the Atlantic Council conducted an interactive study of Community Notes highlighting how the system operated slowly and inconsistently regarding Israel and Gaza misinformation. In one example, an image originally received a Community Note but continued to spread regardless receiving over 3 million views after a week. Hundreds of viral posts from the notes public database were analyzed and according to researchers fast-moving breaking news wasn't labeled. Across 400 posts of misinformation, a note took on average 7 hours to appear, while others took 70 hours. The analysis however did show that over 50% of the posts received a note within 8 hours, with only a few taking longer than 2 days. The study included 100 tweets from 83 users who had signed up to X Premium in the past 4 months, along with 42 tweets from 25 accounts that were reinstated by Elon Musk, including Laura Loomer. The study also included Jackson Hinkle, who appeared multiple times.

Another NewsGuard report found advertising appearing on 15 posts with Community Notes attached in the week of November 13, 2023, indicating that "misinformation super-spreaders" may still be eligible for ad revenue, despite posts with notes attached being ineligible according to Musk. On November 30, a Mashable investigation found most users never see published notes, with examples of notes seen by less than 1% to 5% of users who viewed misinformation content, and overall, a disproportionate number of views on posts compared to the attached notes.

A 2024 study on fact-checking of COVID-19 vaccines sampled 205 Community Notes and found the information accurate in 97% of notes and 49% of cited sources were of high quality. The lead author stated that only a small percentage of misinformation received a note, while published notes were among the most viral content. Another study found that users presented with community notes trusted them more than simple misinformation flags.

In July 2024, after the attempted assassination of Donald Trump, the Center for Countering Digital Hate (CCDH) published a report that of the 100 most popular conspiratorial posts on X about the shooting, only five Community Notes were published to counter the false claim. In October 2024, the CCDH reported that 74% of misinformation about the 2024 United States elections failed to receive notes, based on a sample of 283 posts. Where notes were published, they received 13 times less views than the original post, according to the group.

== See also ==
- Pol.is
- List of Twitter features
- Virtual volunteering
