= Wiki survey =

Survey method for crowdsourcing opinions

A view of the 'opinion space' visualization tool for a Polis wiki survey. Each user can see how similar their voting behavior is to other voters based on their closeness to one another within the two-dimensional space.

Wiki surveys or wikisurveys are a software-based survey method that crowdsource discussions and help participants to find areas of agreement. Other names include bridging systems and collective response systems. The approach, inspired by Wikipedia, is to open up surveys where participants can shape the questions, instead of traditional 'closed' surveys where participants can only respond to the questions asked.

Wiki surveys have been used for purposes including facilitating deliberative democracy, crowdsourcing opinions from experts and figuring out common beliefs on a given topic. A notable usage of wiki surveys is in Taiwan's government system, where citizens can participate in crowdsourced lawmaking through Pol.is wiki surveys.

== Implementations ==
=== All Our Ideas ===
A view of the user interface for seeing in real-time the results of an All Our Ideas wiki survey. The top 10 ranked items are shown in this view of the interface.

A view of the user interface for casting votes on and submitting items to an All Our Ideas wiki survey. After casting a vote, a heuristic determines the next item that will be shown. The heuristic favors showing items with relatively low numbers of votes.

All Our Ideas founders coined the term "wiki survey," explaining how they took inspiration from the organic evolution of Wikipedia and hoped to create something similar for surveys. They hosted 5000 surveys between 2010 and 2014. A 2020 survey using the tool found 3 of its top 10 findings were user-generated.

=== Decidim ===
Decidim has been used by governments throughout Spain and Europe to help with participatory budgeting and other public policy decisions.

=== Polis ===
Polis (also known as Pol.is) was developed in 2012. The focus of Polis is to project participants into an 'opinion space' where they can see how their voting behavior compares to other participants. The opinion space clusters participants into groups of similar opinion and is designed in a way to avoid tyranny of the majority by being able to include groups that have small numbers of participants. The questions participants are presented with are agree/disagree/pass on a single 'comment' submitted by a participant. The code for Polis is free and open-source software under the GNU AGPL.

=== Remesh ===
Remesh was founded in 2013 and has partnered with the United Nations and Alliance for Middle East Peace efforts to bring peaceful resolutions to conflicts. Participants are anonymous and the algorithm can be fine-tuned to better understand local dialects in specific regions.

== Examples ==
- PlaNYC used All Our Ideas to gather ideas on how to establish New York City's sustainability plan
- vTaiwan, a citizen-lead government process in Taiwan, uses Polis for enabling large amounts of citizens to deliberate and consequently provide input on Taiwan's legislative decisions
- OECD used All Our Ideas to gather ideas from the public prior to meeting for a forum and meeting on which skills are most important to invest in for the 21st century
- March On, an offshoot of the Women's March Movement, used Polis to understand the opinions of people wanting to support the movement
- Residents of Harrogate use Polis to debate issues in their community, with the results being released publicly to everyone

== Characteristics ==
Wiki surveys often have these three characteristics:

=== Collaborativeness ===
Wiki surveys allow participants to contribute questions, as well as answer questions created by its participants.

=== Adaptivity ===
Wiki surveys adapt to elicit the most useful information from its participants. One example involves changing the ordering of questions based on the voting behavior of previous participants so as to maximize consensus. The heuristic determining the ordering of questions highly values showing the comments that have been voted on the least.

=== 'Greediness' ===
In the context of wiki surveys, 'greediness' simply means making full use of information that participants are willing to provide. Wiki surveys do not require participants to answer a fixed amount of questions, so participants can answer as little or as much as they want. This is intended to be more efficient in capturing participants' preferences by allowing more organic sharing of their perspectives.

== Traditional survey methods vs. wiki surveys ==
Questions in traditional survey methods fall into two categories: Open and closed questions. Open questions ask the person taking the survey to write an open response while closed questions give a fixed set of responses to select from. Wiki surveys are like a hybrid of the two, enabling insightful consensus in certain situations where traditional survey methods may lack. Closed questions are easy to analyze quantitively, but the limited options to select from for a given question may cause bias. Open questions are not as subject to bias, but are difficult to analyze quantitatively at scale. Wiki surveys allow for open responses by the users' contribution of survey questions (also called 'items'), and uses machine learning techniques to (at least partially) automate the quantitative analysis of the responses to those questions.

== See also ==
- Civic technology
- Community Notes
- Online deliberation
