= World Youth Movement for Democracy =

The World Youth Movement for Democracy (WYMD) was created in 2004 at the Third Assembly of the World Movement in Durban South Africa by an international body of young democracy and human rights activists. WYMD is a branch of the World Movement for Democracy, and it retains the organization's core values such as the belief in a broad-based democracy that adapts itself to different cultures. WYMD promotes a set of values, including rule of law, human rights, and free media, in all societies, and it works to create these values in some countries and strengthen them in others. In addition, the Youth Movement has several more specific, youth related purposes. It serves as a means for youth activists to come together to share ideas, network, and collaborate on projects, which helps further their knowledge of democracy issues and provides them with a practical skill set.

== Structure ==
The Youth Movement is led by a steering committee that is composed of no more than 10 members at a time who represent the regions of the Americas, Europe, Africa, Asia, and the Middle East. Committee members are elected for a two-year term by members of WYMD. The Secretariat also works to coordinate meetings with members and reach out to new members.

== Current projects ==
The stated aim of the World Youth Movement's programs is to increase knowledge of democratic ideals, collaboration among other youth organizations, and development of international solidarity networks that support youth in adverse circumstances. The World Movement for Democracy's activities include hosting democracy-related essay and photo contest, a regular newsletter, a fellowship program, and regular, online discussion panel webinars on youth-related topics.

The World Movement for Democracy hosts a general youth assembly for its members, which takes place during the biannual World Movement for Democracy Global Assembly. The World Youth Assembly is organized in two parts: a session devoted to a democracy issue of high relevance to youth and a session devoted to the organization developmentof the World Youth Movement.

Every year on October 18, the World Youth Movement for Democracy commemorates the World Youth Day for Democracy, a day when “young democracy supporters celebrate their role in fighting for and strengthening democracy.” In past years, WYMD-network youth organizations around the world have celebrated the day by hosting meetings and events, volunteer, creating art, and otherwise coming out in support of human rights and democratic principles.
