= Indonesian Future Leaders =

Indonesian Future Leaders (IFL) is a non-profit organization which focuses its activity on youth empowerment and social voluntarism. It was founded on September 27, 2009 by 7 youths aged 17–18 to nurture Indonesia’s future leaders who are capable of being the agent of change for their community. The organization is run by all youths and has approximately 150 staffs, 700 volunteers, and 30,000 online supporters as of early 2013 spread all in its seven chapters in Jakarta, Bandung, Malang, Yogyakarta, Bali, Medan, and Bulukumba (South Sulawesi). IFL’s tagline of “Initiate, Act, Share, Inspire” is represented in its various capacity building, community development, and advocacy projects online and offline which aim to create socially aware future leaders of Indonesia. In February 2012, IFL has won the Millennium Development Goals awards presented by the government of the Republic of Indonesia for its active involvement in promoting the MDGs to Indonesian youths. Currently, IFL is led by Muhammad Iman Usman as the President and Dian Aditya Ning Lestari as the Vice President.

== Programs ==
=== School of Volunteers ===
School of Volunteers is a social project competition which is held biannually by the Indonesian Future Leaders, targeted specifically for high school students across Indonesia. The event consists of two main parts, namely the Roadshows and the Volunteering Camp. The Roadshow is a series of thematic workshop held in various high schools across Indonesia aimed to create awareness about a particular social issue among high school students. In each workshop, participating students will get a chance to work as a team and throw in their ideas of planning a social project. Meanwhile, the Volunteering Camp is a camp for the social project competition finalists from each roadshow where they will get a chance to learn more about managing a social project as well as finalizing and presenting their social projects in front of the judges.

The School of Volunteers 2010 adapted the 10 Millennium Development Goals as the main theme for the overall event. This project involved a total of 421 high school students from Jakarta, Bogor, Depok, Tangerang, and Bekasi area and generated as many as 81 social project ideas. The winner of the School of Volunteers 2010 was team Hermes from SMA Negeri 8 Jakarta with their project named Petualangan Sabtu Minggu (The Saturday-Sunday Adventure), a project aimed to promote the 3rd MDG, i.e. the concept of gender equality, among children in which the participants can get to know more about various occupations and be inspired by the professionals who have stood out of the occupational gender stereotyping.

This year, IFL continued to host similar program, the School of Volunteers 2012, with a main theme of Securing the Future of Indonesian Children. The Roadshow of this program will be held in four cities where IFL’s four chapters are based, which are Bulukumba, Bandung, Yogyakarta and Jakarta.

=== Youth Parliament of Indonesia ===
Youth Parliament of Indonesia is a simulation of a parliamentary session targeted for the youth of Indonesia. This program is inspired by the UK Youth Parliament and European Union Youth Parliament. Youth Parliament of Indonesia aims to create politically aware youths of Indonesia so that they are able to speak up their creative ideas to solve for some common problems in Indonesia, such as education, environmental sustainability and healthcare.

This event involves as many as 33 youths as the representative of each provinces in Indonesia. These 33 candidates have to undergo many stages similar to the real life parliamentary system, starting from campaign, election, and representing their constituents during the sessions. The result of these sessions will then be given as a policy recommendation for the Indonesian House of Representatives and related governmental ministries. The program was held in October 2011 – February 2012.

=== Other Activities ===
Currently, IFL is running four routine programs such as Children Behind Us, SEAChange, IFL Goes to School, and Speak Up! besides organizing training and seminars. Children Behind Us is a weekly program for underprivileged children in the outskirts of Jakarta. It involves a free educational programs such as English and Art classes. Besides that, IFL is also collecting 100,000 testimonials from children in under the banner of Students for Tomorrow. The testimonials will be sent to the government and the schools in all 33 provinces of Indonesia to raise awareness for the plight of the children in the country.
