= Citizinvestor =

Civic Crowdfunding Platform

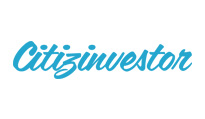
- Website type: Civic crowdfunding
- Available in: English
- Headquarters: Tampa, FL
- Owners: Roark Rearden & Hamot Capital Management
- Creators: Jordan Raynor, Tony DeSisto, Erik Rapprich
- Founders: Jordan Raynor, Tony DeSisto, Joy Randels
- CEO: Joy Randels
- Website: www.citizinvestor.com
- Commercial: Yes
- Launched: April 2012; 14 years ago
- Current status: Acquired

For project funding, Citizinvestor was a civic crowdfunding website that describes itself as a "crowdfunding and civic engagement platform for local government projects on the United States."

== Overview ==
Citizinvestor was an online crowdfunding platform specifically focused on raising money for public projects and community infrastructure, started in Tampa, Florida by Jordan Raynor, Tony DeSisto, Erik Rapprich, and Joy Randels. It was launched in partnership with the city of Philadelphia.

It was inspired by a case in Davis Islands where the community wanted a swimming pool repaired, but the city did not have the finances to do so; citizens successfully raised the funds with events and going door-to-door and this became the model for Citizinvestor. The founders hope to "spark a rise of micro philanthropists". The platform allows citizens to promote independent projects through a petition process and also works with city officials to crowdfund civic projects that were planned but abandoned due to budget constraints.

While anyone can start petitions for new projects, projects can only be submitted by government entities, usually municipal governments. Donations are tax deductible, and donors are not charged if their project does not reach its funding target. Unlike other crowdfunding platforms, no perks/rewards are offered. The site's initial focus was on projects: between $10,000 and $20,000.

Citizinvestor also offered a software as a service product, Citizinvestor Connect. Local municipalities, public-private partnerships, economic development organizations, and nonprofits can license the platform and customize it for their organization, leveraging it to raise funds and engage with their community.
