= Net Party =

Argentine political party

Net party Partido De la Red
- Abbreviation: PdR
- Leader: Santiago Siri
- Founded: April 2012; 14 years ago

Website
- partido.red

The Net Party (Spanish: Partido de la Red) was a political party headquartered in Argentina. The company proposes an online form of liquid democracy that it calls "net democracy" based on the Internet. Their goal is to elect representatives who will reliably vote according to what the citizenry decide online.

== History ==
The party was founded by Santiago Siri and Esteban Brenman in April 2012. It received the required support of 4000 citizens (to officially exist as a party) in August 2013. During the October 2013 elections, Net Party ran for a seat in the local parliament of Buenos Aires and achieved 21,000 votes (1% of the votes). As of 2013, it was working to improve a software package called DemocracyOS.

After these elections the Net Party worked together with the Legislature of the city of Buenos Aires in the implementation of Demos, was a platform in which the citizens of the city of Buenos Aires could qualify from a list of 20 projects of law, of all political parties, those that they considered most relevant. The launch of the platform was on November 5 (in 2014), referring to Guy Fawkes.

In 2015, the Net Party was presented again to elections represented by Gonzalo Stupenengo in the list of deputies of the city of Buenos Aires by the "Cambiemos" big tent, with Gonzalo Stupenengo he worked again in 2018 with the Legislature of the city of Buenos Aires for the implementation of "Participemos" an online platform where the citizens of Buenos Aires can choose what proposals will be taken to vote later, with the technology of Democracy Earth.

In addition, the party presented a bill to regularize Uber in the city of Buenos Aires.

== Expansion ==
This Net Party continued to expand in 2015, with the development of independent nodes of political parties that share the same name and purpose. In Uruguay the Digital Party was created. This party was created in Uruguay after some Uruguayans were motivated by the electoral performance of the Net Party in Argentina.

== DemocracyOS ==
In 2012, the Net Party created an open-source software package (DemocracyOS) to be installed on computer servers and to function as a new venue for democratic participation.

1. Citizens are able to vote on existing legislative projects being discussed in the local parliament; this allows more power to constituents to determine how the party's congressman will vote.
2. This platform also acts as a space to propose and vote on new law proposals; they are then officially presented by the party's congressman if they meet a threshold of citizen support.

A 2015 Wired article said DemocracyOS was supposed to be more collaborative than just a collection of likes/dislikes. DemocracyOS also joined Y Combinator in 2015.
