= E2D International =

Organisation for electronic direct democracy parties

- Abbreviation: E2D
- Formation: January 1, 2011
- Type: International nongovernmental organisation
- Legal status: Unregistered
- Purpose: Political
- Headquarters: Online
- Members: E2D parties and affiliated associations
- Main organ: General Assembly
- Website: e2d-international.org (defunct)

E2D International (E2D) was the political international of the electronic direct democracy (E2D) party movement. The E2D Manifesto described the basic political principles of E2D International member parties. Most of the member parties are defunct. The Swedish Direktdemokraterna remains as the last active party as of November 2020.

== Project ==
To help create and promote parties with only one element in their program: direct democracy ("a form of democracy in which sovereignty is lodged in the assembly of all citizens who choose to participate").

E2D parties were to be politically non-partisan and their agenda entirely based on people's decision, determined by means of referendums and initiatives organized by party members and citizens. These organized systems were supposed to allow citizens to vote on propositions of laws submitted by elected members of parliament, but also to propose new laws.

== Mission ==
The mission for E2D International was "to help establish, to support and promote, and to maintain communication and co-operation between politically-neutral electronic direct democracy parties around the world."

== The E2D Manifesto ==
The E2D Manifesto, collaboratively drafted in February 2011 by representatives from Citizens for Direct Democracy, Online Party of Canada, Partido de Internet, Aktiv Demokrati, Demoex, Senator Online and Partidul Romania Online using Participedia.net, was a document which described the basic political principles of E2D International. The E2D Manifesto was inspired by the ideas of Aki Orr, amongst others.

== Parties ==
E2D was active in several countries.

Country	Name	Registration status	Member of E2D International	Elected	Voting system
Australia	Online Direct Democracy Party	Inactive	Yes	No	Sovereign
Belgium	Citizens for Direct Democracy	Inactive	Yes	No	—N/a
Canada	Party for Accountability, Competency and Transparency / Parti pour la Responsabilisation, la Compétence et la Transparence	Inactive	No	No	Proprietary
Denmark	Direkte Demokrati	Inactive	No	No	—N/a
Hungary	Party of Internet Democracy	Dissolved in 2010	No	No	—N/a
Israel	Hayeshira	No	No	No	—N/a
New Zealand	OurNZ Party	No	No	No	—N/a
Romania	Partidul Romania Online	Inactive	Yes	No	—N/a
Slovenia	Svojpolitik.si	Inactive	Yes	No	—N/a
Spain	Internet Party (Spain)	Inactive	No	No	—N/a
Sweden	Direktdemokraterna	Officially registered	Yes	No	GOV

== See also ==
- Anticipatory democracy
- Collaborative e-democracy
- Collaborative governance
- Consensus democracy
- Deliberative democracy
- Demarchy
- Direct democracy
- E-participation
- E-democracy
- Electronic direct democracy
- Grassroots democracy
- Inclusive Democracy
- Open source governance
- Non-partisan democracy
- Participatory budgeting
- Participatory economics
- Participatory justice
- Public incubator
- Public sphere
- Public participation
- Radical transparency
- Rationality and power
- Sociocracy
- Workers' council
