= Pia Mancini =

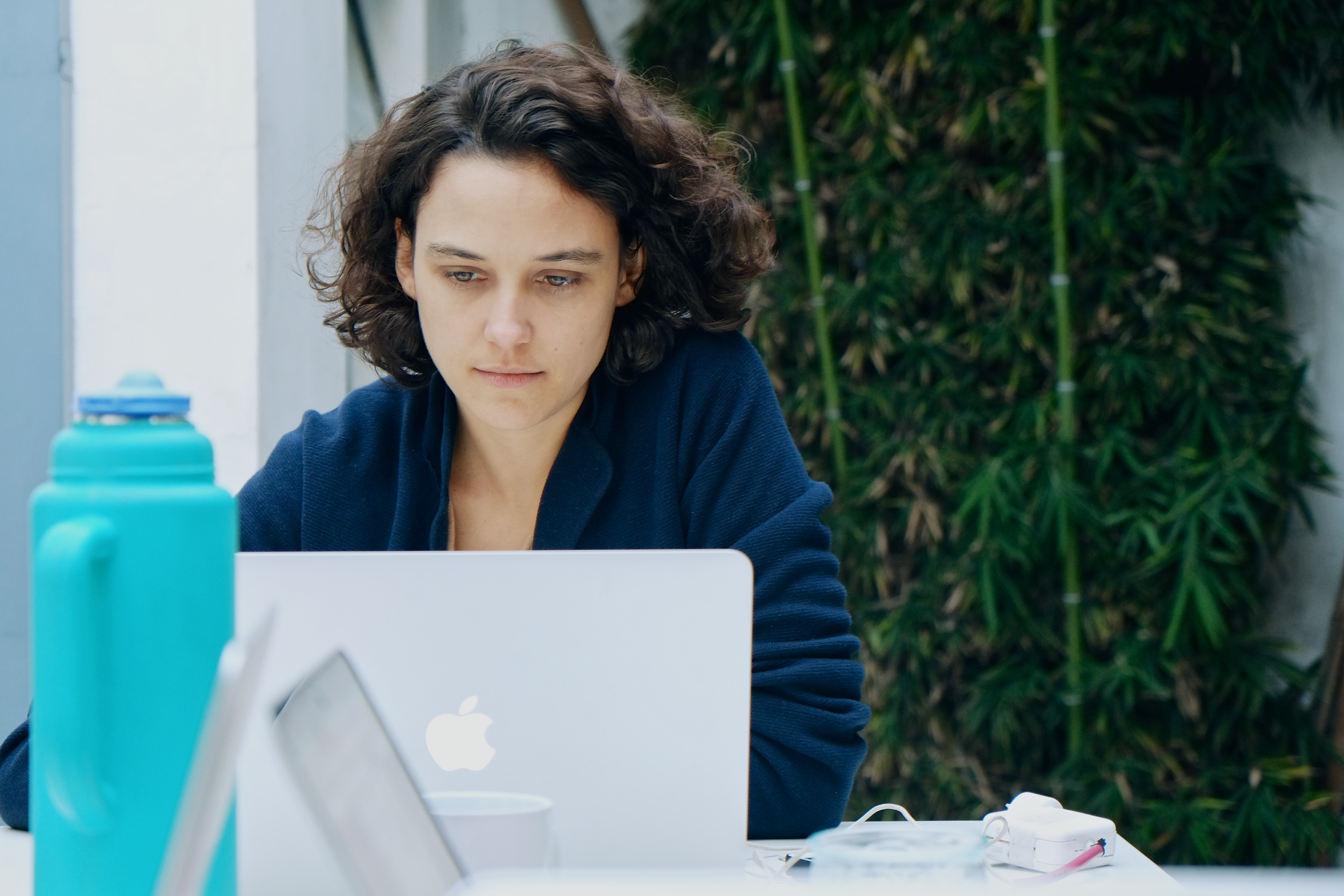
- Known for: online, open-source democracy activist

Pia Mancini is an activist and technical project leader from Argentina. She is co-founder of Democracy Earth and Open Collective. The latter is a project that facilitates open source code contributors to receive donations.

== Career ==
Mancini worked for the Unión Celeste y Blanco, an Argentine political party, from 2010 to 2012, but was dissatisfied with the lack of responsiveness to the public. She subsequently started the Net Democracy foundation, a non-profit, to support citizen participation in government through the use of technology. In 2012, the foundation released DemocracyOS, an online app that allows citizens to understand, discuss and "vote" on new legislation. As a next step, she and her associates founded the Net Party, an Argentine political party that pledges to act according to people's wishes as expressed online.

In 2013 she co-founded the non-profit Democracy Earth, based in Palo Alto, California, which provides an online platform for political groups, and in January 2016 she co-founded Open Collective, which provides a platform for open-source project groups to collect and spend money semi-transparently.

Her TED talk, How to Upgrade Democracy for the Internet Era, received over a million views.

== See also ==
- Direct democracy
- Liquid democracy
- LiquidFeedback
- Open-source governance
