= LiquidFriesland =

Defunct political institution

LiquidFriesland was an online platform of the Landkreis Friesland, through which a new form of Citizen participation was to be realized. What was new about LiquidFriesland was in particular the linking of forms of online democracy with the Kommunalverfassung prescribed by Landesrecht. The citizen participation platform launched on November 9, 2012.

With the help of the LiquidFeedback program, the aim was to support the process of democratic will formation and decision-making. Citizens of the Friesland district were able to gain personal access to the program from the age of 16 and participate in Discourse on projects for which the district is responsible as a territorial authority, as well as in voting on these projects.

LiquidFriesland was established by the district council of the county on the initiative of Landrat Sven Ambrosy (SPD) unanimously decided. The district council resorted to a model of democracy originating in the United States, which was first discussed in Germany by parts of the Pirate Party of Germany. In 2009, this discussion was the reason for the party-independent development of the software LiquidFeedback by the Public Software Group e. V.

On September 3, 2015, Stephan Eisel, a staff member of the Konrad-Adenauer-Stiftung, stated that since April 10, 2015, the citizen participation platform LiquidFriesland had not registered any activities. At the end of April 2016, the barely used platform was shut down. On December 1, 2016, the relaunch took place. Since then, LiquidFriesland has served as the online platform of the district of Friesland, where citizens can express their suggestions, ideas and criticism.

== Procedure ==
The procedure of participation follows the rules of liquid democracy: Citizens can either cast their vote in votes themselves or delegate it to a person they trust in terms of delegated voting. This person can increase their voting weight in this way.

In the "Project Description" (see Web links), the procedure is illustrated by a concrete example:

28 citizens have registered as members of the topic 'Traffic' (and thus basically signaled interest in individual topics from this area). 15 non-members of traffic are additionally interested in the specific topic. The basic population is then 43. 5 supporters/potential supporters for one of the initiatives are required to bring the entire topic (and thus all initiatives) into the discussion. In the case of the initiative quorum ('2nd quorum'), 5 supporters are required in this example (provided that the population has not changed in the discussion process) in order for the respective initiative to be voted on

The original use of the software, however, was modified for LiquidFriesland: it was initially intended for the formation of wills within parties and other organizations, but not for use in municipalities. LiquidFriesland is the world's first example of such use of a liquid democracy tool. Second, LiquidFeedback was originally intended to enable only bottom-up will formation, as is also possible with LiquidFriesland in the form of citizen procedures. In addition, in the LiquidFriesland version of LiquidFeedback, the possibility was realized to ask citizens about projects of the administration in a top-down procedure (administrative procedure).

== Legal classification ==
Due to the requirements of the Lower Saxony Gemeindeordnung, LiquidFriesland cannot be an instrument of a Direct democracy, i.e. it cannot replace a citizens' petition and a citizens' referendum. Only these instruments can lead to directly legally effective results, which can also override a vote of the county council. Voting results by LiquidFriesland have legally the character of a suggestion in the sense of § 34 of the Lower Saxony Municipal Constitution Act in the case of citizen procedures; in the case of administrative procedures, § 35 of the Act is applied analogously by obtaining opinions. However, the members of the Friesland district council assured that they would take the citizens' votes into account in their votes.

The reaction of German pirates to the LiquidFriesland project causes irritation. Janto Just ("pirate", which moved on the list "citizens for citizens" into the district council of the district Friesland) criticized at first, LiquidFriesland has nothing to do with the direct democracy striven for by it, criticized after the beginning of the project, there "romp the usual suspects" and finally, at the turn of the year 2012–2013, he passed off the success of the project as the success of the Pirate Party. Just's initial assessment is contradicted by large parts of his own party, calling for support for local pilot projects on digital participation modeled on LiquidFriesland. For example, Christopher Lauer, parliamentary group leader of the Pirate Party in the House of Representatives of Berlin, stated as early as August 15, 2012:

The district of Friesland, for example, is just making a revolution. That's where the action is. They've launched Liquid Friesland. It's a concept that allows the citizens of this district to get totally involved online. I'm envious to say that they are the vanguard of liquid democracy in Germany. The Pirates are still lagging behind.

—

== Practical experiences and future expectations ==
LiquidFriesland launched on November 9, 2012. In the fall of 2013, the test phase expired. By May 16, 2013, 706 access codes to LiquidFriesland had been sent out by the district administration. Of these, 473 were converted into active accesses. The number of users participating in the final votes was up to 50 users. For citizen initiatives, the average voting participation was 22.07 users, and for administrative initiatives, 27.86 users. A representative of the district CDU announced at a district council meeting that it would only agree to continue the project if at least an average of 100 to 200 users regularly participated in the voting by the end of the test phase.

In May 2014, Stephan Eisel published his analysis "Liquid Friesland - a failed experiment", referring to the extremely low citizen participation in the platform and triggering heated discussions. In 2015, Eisel even assessed LiquidFriesland as an "Internet corpse."

In response to the September 2014 evaluation report, Sönke Klug, press spokesman for the district of Friesland, stated that success could not be measured by user numbers: "Around 550 people who are interested in district politics, who receive information via newsletter, are considerably more than before who actively exercise their civil rights. From our point of view, this is a great success." Apart from that, District Administrator Ambrosy had already argued in September 2013 at a meeting of the Friesland District Council that rights should not be cancelled if they were not (sufficiently) exercised. Because a democracy lives from the possibility. Its essence is that it grants rights - which one exercises or does not exercise. In October 2015, the SPD/Green group in the Friesland County Council, together with County Administrator Ambrosy, announced that the LiquidFriesland platform was to be "reanimated".

Günter Hoffmann of the Wiener Zeitung pointed out in February 2015 that digital top-down procedures had proven to be a successful model (not only in the district of Friesland). This did not surprise him, he said, because participation platforms originally came from industry. There, they are used in particular by IT companies in product development to bundle the idle and partially decoupled knowledge of employees working separately and to let it flow into product development. In other companies, the software is used for greater customer integration. In this way, trends can be identified at an early stage and innovation cycles can be greatly shortened through continuous feedback, and potential errors can often be detected and corrected more quickly. This development is now also reaching those responsible in the municipalities. Every fourth authority wants to involve its citizens more in administrative decisions and is therefore investing in dialog. According to Hoffmann, small municipalities in particular want to use electronic participation platforms to improve citizen involvement in political and administrative decisions.

Participedia recommends, "To have a future and be a model for other projects of a similar nature, Friesland probably needs to look for ways to make participation attractive to other user groups and over a longer period of time." To increase the attractiveness of LiquidFriesland, all documents submitted to county council members for deliberations in public meetings will be made digitally accessible to all accredited participants starting in 2015.

The Landkreis Görlitz emphasizes in the open-ended investigation of the question of whether LiquidFriesland is a model worth imitating for it that "the analysis of already existing participation formats with regard to their degree of effectiveness as well as the involvement and qualification of the population already during the introduction of such an instrument [...] are conditions for the sustainable success of such a format".

== Imitators ==
In February 2015, the Landkreis Rotenburg (Wümme) launched the citizens' platform ROW, modeled on LiquidFriesland; in March 2017, it was decided to abolish it and replace it with an online form in the Suggestions and Criticism section on the homepage of the district administration. At the same time, the cities of Seelze and Wunstorf activated comparable platforms.
