= Open-source governance =

School of thought advocating free access to lawmaking for the people

Open-source governance (also known as open governance and open politics) is a political philosophy which advocates the application of the philosophies of the open-source and open-content movements to democratic principles to enable any interested citizen to add to the creation of policy, as with a wiki document. Legislation is democratically opened to the general citizenry, employing their collective wisdom to benefit the decision-making process and improve democracy.

Theories on how to constrain, limit or enable this participation vary. Accordingly, there is no one dominant theory of how to go about authoring legislation with this approach. There are a wide array of projects and movements which are working on building open-source governance systems.

Many left-libertarian and radical centrist organizations around the globe have begun advocating open-source governance and its related political ideas as a reformist alternative to current governance systems. Often, these groups have their origins in decentralized structures such as the Internet and place particular importance on the need for anonymity to protect an individual's right to free speech in democratic systems. Opinions vary, however, not least because the principles behind open-source government are still very loosely defined.

== Applications of the principles ==
In practice, several applications have evolved from the rule of law open justice use of governance in democratic institutions:

- Open-government mechanisms including those for public participation and engagement, such as the use of IdeaScale, Google Moderator, Semantic MediaWiki, GitHub, and other software by actual ruling governments – these mechanisms are well-developed, especially in the UK and the US, or by civil society and citizens directly for example, Opengovpioneers in the UK, and the Scottish Nature Finance Pioneers in Scotland.
- Open-politics forums and wikis, where political issues and arguments can be debated, either within or between political party constraints, taking three distinct forms:
  - Political-party-platform development, in which ideas are solicited from anyone or almost anyone and openly discussed to a point but the ranking and devotion of resources to developing ideas is reserved to party members or supporters. A variant is the non-partisan think-tank or citizen-advocacy group-platform development as has become common in Canada, for example the Dominion Institute policywiki.
  - Citizen journalism forums obeying stricter rules to ensure equal power relationships than is typically the case in blogs, strictly designed to balance libel and free speech laws for a local jurisdiction (following laws strictly is part of the open politics ideal).
  - Open party mechanisms to actually govern and operate formal political parties without the usual insider politics and interest groups that historically have taken over such parties; these experiments have been limited and typically take the form of parties run by referendums or online. An example of this is Italy's Five Star Movement.
- In the California Assembly, Crowdsourced legislation via a 'wiki bills' website is being initiated via an online wiki, with an introduction deadline of early February, 2015.
- Hybrid mechanisms which attempt to provide journalistic coverage, political platform development, political transparency, strategic advice, and critique of a ruling government of the same party all at the same time. Dkosopedia is the best known example of this.

Some models are significantly more sophisticated than a plain wiki, incorporating semantic tags, levels of control or scoring to mediate disputes – however this always risks empowering a clique of moderators more than would be the case given their trust position within the democratic entity – a parallel to the common wiki problem of official vandalism by persons entrusted with power by owners or publishers (so-called "sysop vandalism" or "administrative censorship").

== Common and simultaneous policy ==
Some advocates of these approaches, by analogy to software code, argue for a "central codebase" in the form of a set of policies that are maintained in a public registry and that are infinitely reproducible. "Distributions" of this policy-base are released (periodically or dynamically) for use in localities, which can apply "patches" to customize them for their own use. Localities are also able to cease subscribing to the central policy-base and "fork" it or adopt someone else's policy-base. In effect, the government stems from emergent cooperation and self-correction among members of a community. As the policies are put into practice in a number of localities, problems and issues are identified and solved, and where appropriate communicated back to the core.

These goals for instance were cited often during the Green Party of Canada's experiments with open-political-platform development. As one of over a hundred national Green party entities worldwide and the ability to co-ordinate policy among provincial and municipal equivalents within Canada, it was in a good position to maintain just such a central repository of policy, despite being legally separate from those other entities.

== Difference from prior initiatives ==
Open-source governance differs from previous open-government initiatives in its broader emphasis on collaborative processes. After all...

...simply publishing snapshots of government information is not enough to make it open.

— Digital Government: Building a 21st Century Platform to Better Serve the American People

== History ==
The "Imagine Halifax" (IH) project was designed to create a citizens' forum for elections in Halifax, Nova Scotia in fall 2004. Founded by Angela Bischoff, the widow of Tooker Gomberg, a notable advocate of combining direct action with open politics methods, IH brought a few dozen activists together to compile a platform (using live meetings and email and seedwiki followup). When it became clear that candidates could not all endorse all elements of the platform, it was then turned into questions for candidates in the election. The best ideas from candidates were combined with the best from activists – the final scores reflected a combination of convergence and originality. In contrast to most such questionnaires, it was easier for candidates to excel by contributing original thought than by simply agreeing. One high scorer, Andrew Younger, had not been involved with the project originally but was elected and appeared on TV with project leader Martin Willison. The project had not only changed its original goal from a partisan platform to a citizen questionnaire, but it had recruited a previously uninvolved candidate to its cause during the election. A key output of this effort was a glossary of about 100 keywords relevant to municipal laws.

The 2004–05 Green Party of Canada Living Platform was a much more planned and designed effort at open politics. As it prepared itself for an electoral breakthrough in the 2004 federal election, the Green Party of Canada began to compile citizen, member and expert opinions in preparation of its platform. During the election, it gathered input even from Internet trolls including supporters of other parties, with no major problems: anonymity was respected and, if they were within the terms of use, comments remained intact. Despite, or perhaps because of, its early success, it was derailed by Jim Harris, the party's leader, when he discovered that it was a threat to his status as a party boss. The Living Platform split off as another service entirely out of GPC control and eventually evolved into OpenPolitics.ca and a service to promote wiki usage among citizens and political groups.

The Liberal Party of Canada also attempted a deep policy renewal effort in conjunction with its leadership race in 2006. While candidates in that race, notably Carolyn Bennett, Stéphane Dion and Michael Ignatieff, all made efforts to facilitate web-threaded policy-driven conversations between supporters, all failed to create lateral relationships and thus also failed to contribute much to the policy renewal effort.

Numerous very different projects related to open-source governance collaborate under the umbrella of the Metagovernment project; Metagovernment uses the term "collaborative governance", most of which are building platforms of open-source governance.

Aktivdemokrati is a Direct democratic party, running for the parliament of Sweden Democracylab.org is a Seattle Washington nonprofit (501(c)(3) nonprofit organization, partnered with the Oregon 150 Project, building an online public think tank in which the votes of users determines policy, seeking to connect the values people hold to their positions on issues and the policies they advocate. Votorola is software for building consensus and reaching decisions on local, national and global levels. The White House 2 was a project which crowdsourced the U.S. agenda, "imagining how the White House might work if it was run completely democratically by thousands of people on the internet." Wikicracy has developed a Mediawiki-based platform using most of Open politics criteria These grassroots efforts have been matched by government initiatives that seek similar goals. A more extensive list of these and similar organizations is available externally.

Future Melbourne is a wiki-based collaborative environment for developing Melbourne's 10-year plan. During public consultation periods, it enables the public to edit the plan with the same editing rights as city personnel and councilors.

The New Zealand Police Act Review was a wiki used to solicit public commentary during the public consultation period of the acts review.

At linux.conf.au on January 14, 2015, in Auckland, New Zealand, Australian Audrey Lobo-Pulo presented Evaluating Government Policies Using Open Source Models, agitating for government policy related knowledge, data and analysis to be freely available to everyone to use, modify and distribute without restriction — "a parallel universe where public policy development and analysis is a dynamic, collaborative effort between government and its citizens". Audrey reported that the motivation for her work was personal uncertainty about the nature and accuracy of models, estimates and assumptions used to prepare policies released with the 2014 Australian Federal Government Budget, and whether and to what extent their real world impact is assessed following implementation. A white paper on "Evaluating Government Policies using Open Source Models" was released on September 10, 2015.

== Open politics as a distinct theory ==
The open-politics theory, a narrow application of open-source governance, combines aspects of the free software and open-content movements, promoting decision-making methods claimed to be more open, less antagonistic, and more capable of determining what is in the public interest with respect to public policy issues. It takes special care for instance to deal with equity differences, geographic constraints, defamation versus free political speech, accountability to persons affected by decisions, and the actual standing law and institutions of a jurisdiction. There is also far more focus on compiling actual positions taken by real entities than developing theoretical "best" answers or "solutions". One example, DiscourseDB, simply lists articles pro and con a given position without organizing their argument or evidence in any way.

While some interpret it as an example of "open-source politics", open politics is not a top–down theory but a set of best practices from citizen journalism, participatory democracy and deliberative democracy, informed by e-democracy and netroots experiments, applying argumentation framework for issue-based argument as they evolved in academic and military use through the 1980s to present. Some variants of it draw on the theory of scientific method and market methods, including prediction markets and anticipatory democracy.

Its advocates often engage in legal lobbying and advocacy to directly change laws in the way of the broader application of the technology, e.g. opposing political libel cases in Canada, fighting libel chill generally, and calling for clarification of privacy and human rights law especially as they relate to citizen journalism. They are less focused on tools although the semantic mediawiki and tikiwiki platforms seem to be generally favored above all others.

== See also ==
- Argument map
- Collaborative E-democracy
- Collaborative Governance
- Collaborative Innovation Network
- DemocracyOS
- Direct democracy
- Dynamic Governance
- E-democracy
- E-government
- E-participation
- Electronic voting
- Joinup collaboration platform
- Netroots
- LiquidFeedback
- Online participation
- Open content
- Open government data
- Open Government Initiative
- Open Voting Consortium
- Panarchism
- Polycentric law
- Radical transparency
- Simultaneous policy
