= Direct Democrats (Sweden) =

Direct Democrats Direktdemokraterna
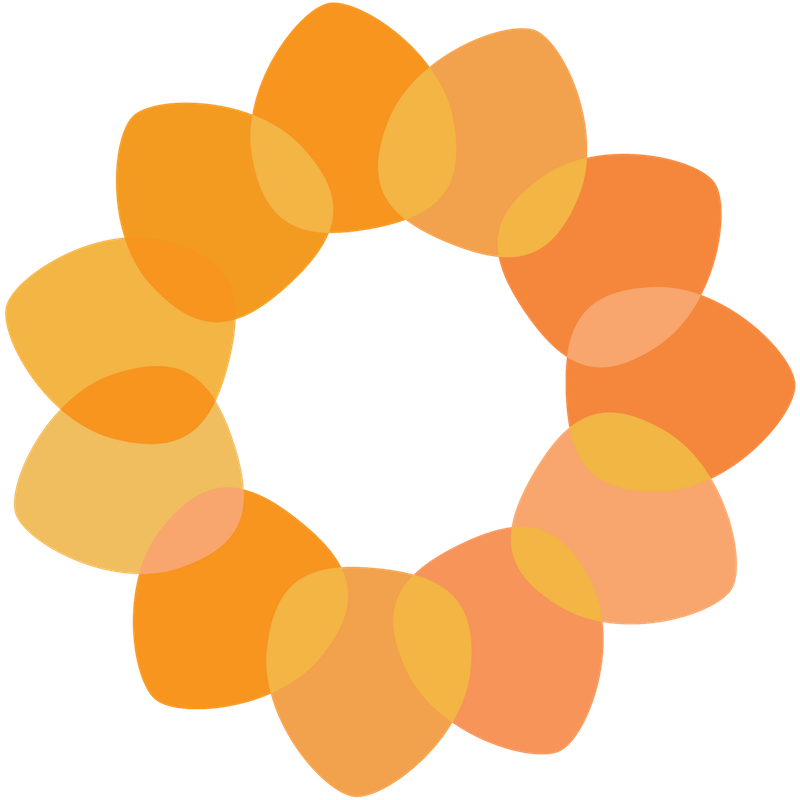
- Abbreviation: DD
- Founded: 4 April 2014
- Ideology: Direct democracy E-democracy
- Political position: Big tent
- International affiliation: E2D International

Website
- direktdemokraterna.se

The Direct Democrats (Swedish: Direktdemokraterna, DD) is a Swedish non-affiliated neutral political party, based on the principles of liquid democracy, a form of direct democracy.

The Direct Democrats believe that the electorate should be able to directly influence their DD representatives by voting on political issues and policy proposals through the Internet. The party received 0.08% of the vote in the 2018 general election, making it the fourth largest party with no representation in the Riksdag.

== History ==
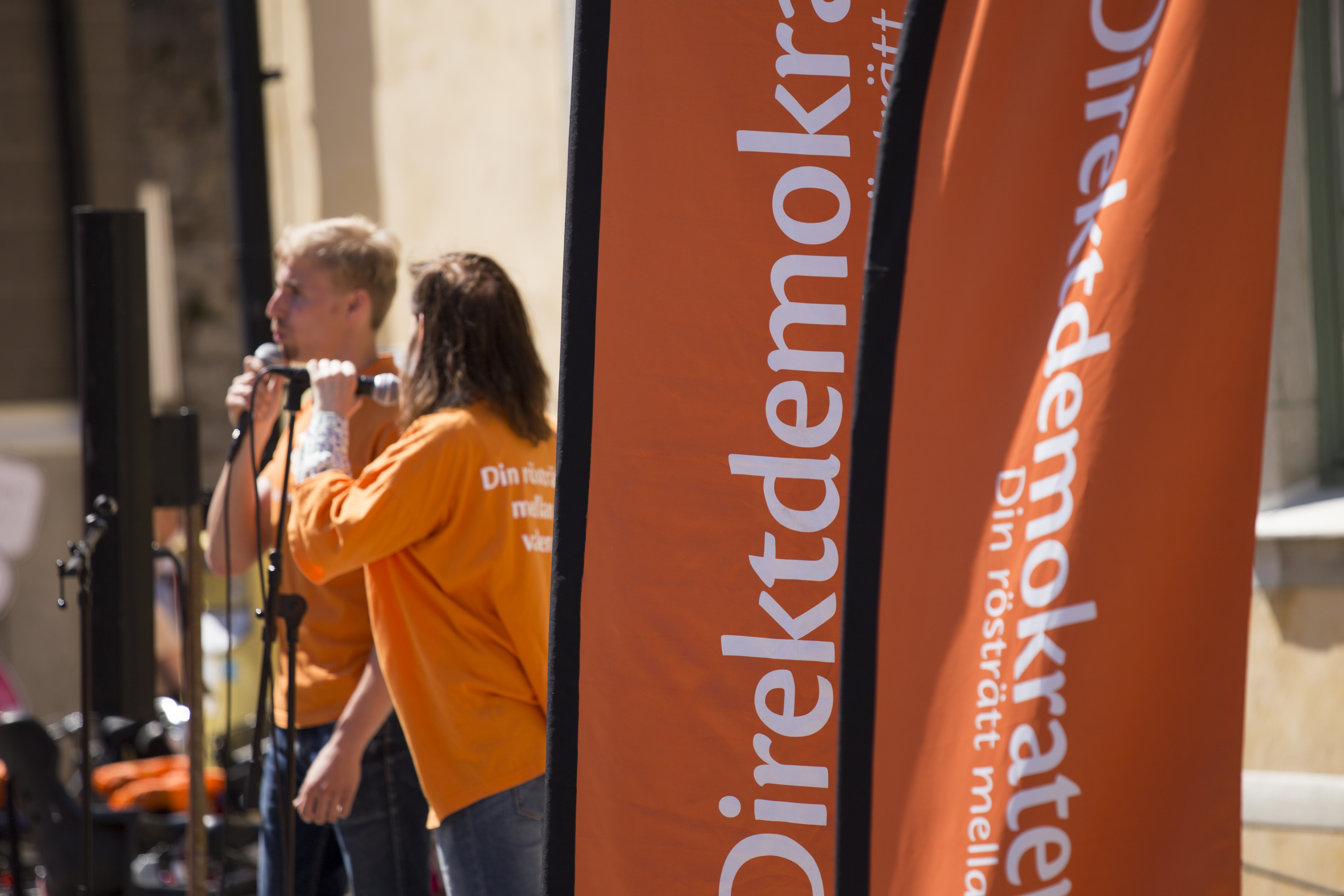

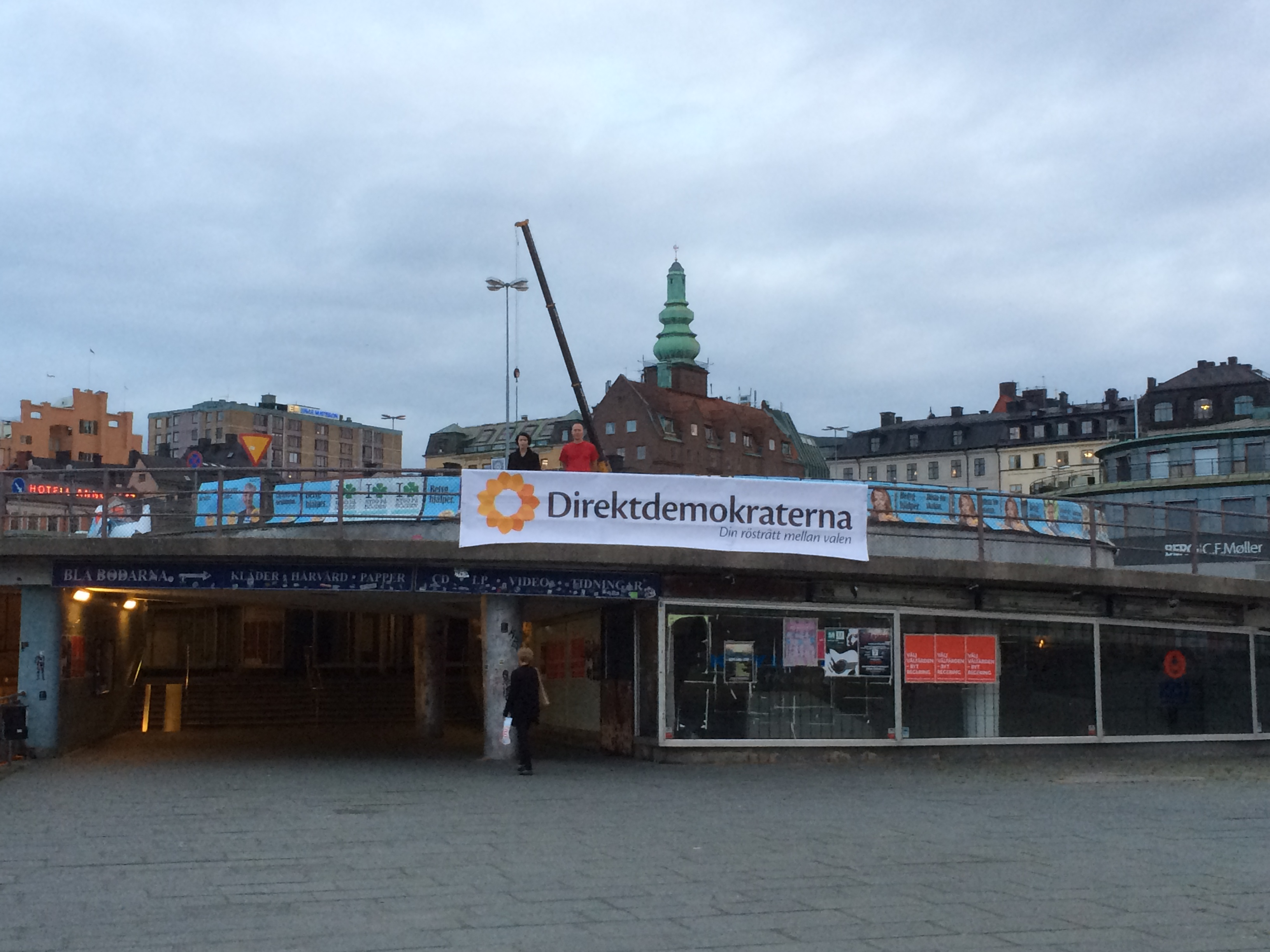
A Direktdemokraterna banner in Stockholm (2014)

The Direct Democrats party was approved by the Swedish Election Authority April 4, 2014. This new party was a merger of three direct democracy parties; Demoex, Aktiv Demokrati, and Äkta Demokrati. DD's short-term goal was to introduce the idea of direct digital democracy (DDD) in Sweden by running for election in 2014. The party received 0.02% of the vote in that year's election.

== Digital democracy application ==
The Direct Democrats party voted in the end of 2016 to use a system for digital democracy being developed by the Swedish non-profit, iGov.Direct® Foundation to be released ahead of the Swedish 2018 September election.

== Election results ==
View source data.

Year	Votes	%	Seats	+/–	Notes
2006	81	0.00 (#26)	0 / 349	New	Extra-parliamentary
2010	76	0.00 (#25)	0 / 349	0	Extra-parliamentary
2014	1,417	0.02 (#17)	0 / 349	0	Extra-parliamentary
2018	5,153	0.08 (#13)	0 / 349	0	Extra-parliamentary
2022	1,755	0.03 (#18)	0 / 349	0	Extra-parliamentary
2026	953	0.01 (#19)	0 / 349	0	Extra-parliamentary
