= Open Collective =

Crowdfunding and financial management platform

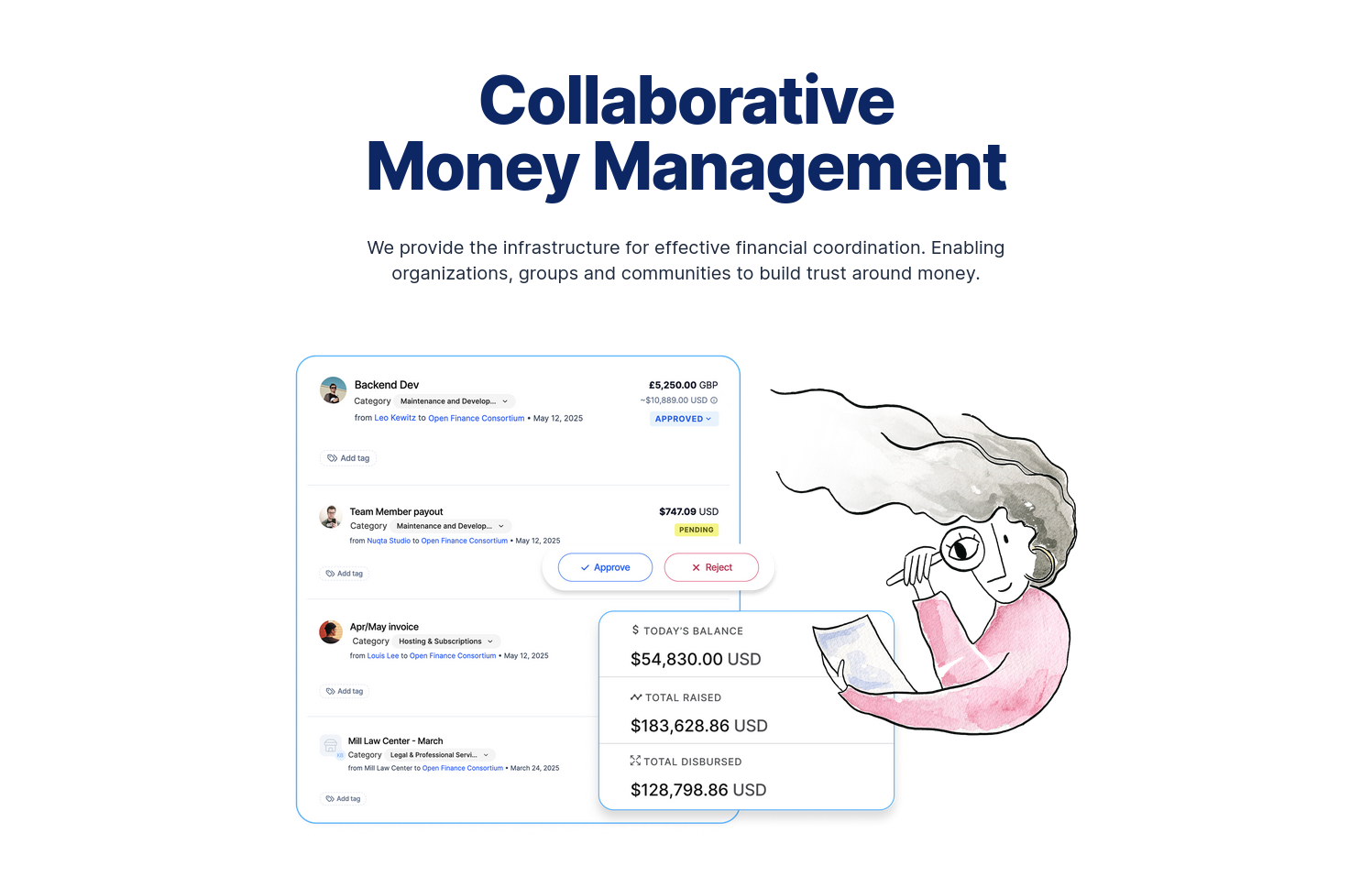
- Original author: Open Collective Inc.
- Type: Crowdfunding and financial management platform
- License: MIT License
- Website: opencollective.com
- Repository: github.com/opencollective/opencollective

Open Collective is an open-source crowdfunding and financial management platform used by grassroots groups, open-source projects, and nonprofit organizations. It enables communities to collect and spend money transparently, often through fiscal hosting arrangements rather than by creating a separate legal entity of their own. It has been described as particularly popular with open-source communities.

Open Collective was originally developed by Open Collective Inc., a for-profit company. Since 2024, the Open Collective platform has been moved under the stewardship of the Open Finance Consortium (OFiCo), a U.S. 501(c)(6) nonprofit association created by organizations that use the platform.

== History ==
Open Collective was created by Storify co-founder Xavier Damman, Democracy Earth's Pia Mancini, and former Dropbox product manager Aseem Sood. In its early years, the platform was operated by Open Collective Inc., a venture-backed startup.

In February 2024, Open Collective Foundation, a separate nonprofit organization that used the platform for fiscal sponsorship, announced that it would dissolve its fiscal sponsorship program by the end of 2024.

In October 2024, Open Collective announced that the existing platform and team would move from Open Collective Inc. to Open Finance Consortium (OFiCo), a newly formed, community-governed nonprofit organized under section 501(c)(6) of the U.S. tax code. The announcement stated that the platform would be established under OFiCo, that the full team building the platform would move to the nonprofit, and that Open Collective Inc. would continue as a separate company.

== Governance ==
As of 2024, the Open Collective platform is stewarded by Open Finance Consortium, which describes itself as a community-governed membership nonprofit. The platform is operated by this non-profit through OFi Technologies (OFiTech).

According to OFiCo's public website, its current members are Open Source Collective, Open Collective Europe, Social Change Nest, Gift Collective, and Raft Foundation.
