= Collaborative governance =

Collaborative governing arrangement

Governance is a broader concept than government and also includes the roles played by the community sector and the private sector in managing and planning countries, regions and cities. Collaborative governance involves the government, community and private sectors communicating with each other and working together to achieve more than any one sector could achieve on its own. Ansell and Gash (2008) have explored the conditions required for effective collaborative governance. They say "The ultimate goal is to develop a contingency approach of collaboration that can highlight conditions under which collaborative governance will be more or less effective as an approach to policy making and public management" Collaborative governance covers both the informal and formal relationships in problem solving and decision-making. Conventional government policy processes can be embedded in wider policy processes by facilitating collaboration between the public, private and community sectors. Collaborative Governance requires three things, namely: support; leadership; and a forum. The support identifies the policy problem that needs to be fixed. The leadership gathers the sectors into a forum. Then, the members of the forum collaborate to develop policies, solutions and answers.

There are many different forms of collaborative governance such as Consensus Building and a Collaborative Network:

- Consensus Building – "A process where stakeholders build consensus on actions to address specific public policy problems; Community visioning is a process where members of a community build consensus on a descriptions of the community's desired future and on actions to help make goals for the future a reality."
- Collaborative Network – "This system is meant to accomplish more alignment among community needs, strategies of service agencies, priority outcomes, and resource allocation. It's also meant to accomplish building social capital; integration of human service delivery; and interconnected strategies for relationship building, learning processes, and measurement and modeling among the participants."

== History ==
Over the past two decades new collaborative approaches to governing and managing have developed in a range of fields, including: urban and regional planning; public administration and law; natural resource management; and environmental management. Collaborative governance has emerged as a response to the failures of government policy implementation and to the high cost and politicization of regulation and as an alternative to managerialism and adversarial approaches. The field of public administration has changed its focus from bureaucracy to that of collaboration in the context of the network society. Public administrators have blurred the lines between the people, the private sector and the government. Although bureaucracies still remain, public administrators have begun to recognize that more can potentially be achieved by collaboration and networking. Collaboration and partnerships are nothing new in the political realm, however the wider use of this leadership style has gained momentum in recent years. In part, this is a response to neoliberalism with its focus on the primacy of the free-market economy and the private sector.

== Definitions ==
Ansell and Gash (2008) define collaborative governance as follows:

'A governing arrangement where one or more public agencies directly engage non-state stakeholders in a collective decision-making process that is formal, consensus-oriented, and deliberative and that aims to make or implement public policy or manage public programs or assets'.

This definition involves six criteria: (1) the forum is initiated by public agencies; (2) participants in the forum include non-state actors; (3) participants engage in decision making and are not merely consulted; (4) the forum is formally organized; (5) the forum aims to make decisions by consensus; and (6) the focus of collaboration is on public policy or public management. Emerson, Nabatchi and Balogh (2012) have developed a less normative and less restrictive definition, as follows:

'The processes and structures of public policy decision making and management that engage people constructively across the boundaries of public agencies, levels of government, and/or the public, private and civic spheres in order to carry out a public purpose that could not otherwise be accomplished.'.

This framework definition is a broader analytic concept and does not limit collaborative governance to state-initiated arrangements and to engagement between government and non-government sectors. For example, the definition encompasses collaboration between governments at different levels and hybrid partnerships initiated by the private or community sectors.

== Advantages ==
The intent of collaborative governance is to improve the overall practice and effectiveness of public administration. The advantages of effective collaborative governance are that it enables a better and shared understanding of complex problems involving many stakeholders and allows these stakeholders to work together and agree on solutions. It can help policy makers identify and target problems and deliver action more effectively. Stakeholders that are involved in developing a solution are more inclined to accept directions given or decisions made. It can thus serve as a way to identify policy solutions that have greater traction in the community. Additionally, it can contribute new perspectives on issues and policy solutions and thus offer new ways to implement strategies for change. For public officials who work in administration and management, collaborative governance can serve as a way of genuinely allowing a wider array of ideas and suggestions in the policy process. It may also be used to test ideas and analyze responses before implementation. For those who are not involved in formal government, it allows them to better understand the inner workings of government and carry more influence in the decision making process. It also enables them to see beyond government institutions being merely a vehicle for service delivery. They are able to feel ownership and a closer relationship to the system, further empowering them to be agents within institutional decision making. For both public and private sectors, a commitment to collaboration is likely to drive organizational change and affect resource reallocation. Other advantages include combining relevant skills and capacities, as well as allowing specialization. Overall, collaborative governance can lead to mutual learning and shared experiences, while also providing direction for institutional capacity building inside and outside agencies and organizations.

== Disadvantages ==
The disadvantages of collaborative governance in relation to complex problems are that the process is time consuming, it may not reach agreement on solutions, and the relevant government agencies may not implement the agreed solutions. In a complex structure with many entities working together, individual roles can become unclear and confusing. Some individuals act largely in a personal capacity, while others may act on behalf of agencies or organizations. Powerful stakeholder groups may seek to manipulate the process. Stakeholders can also begin to feel 'stakeholder fatigue', a feeling they get when they are repeatedly consulted by different agencies on similar issues. This kind of dynamic can be burdensome and time consuming. Structural issues also affect agendas and outcomes. Open structures with loose leadership and membership allow multiple participants to gain access to a fast expanding agenda. Achieving goals in such a wide agenda becomes more difficult as an increasing number of players struggle to resolve differences and coordinate actions. Furthermore, challenges arise for implementation when representatives are allowed to come and go with no real obligations to other collaborators. Accountability of participating members, unequal or hidden agendas, trust between members, power imbalances, and language and cultural barriers are all issues that can arise in collaborative government regimes. Critics argue that collaborative governance does not provide the institutional stability and consistency required, and therefore deters progress. The work of Ansell and Gash (2008) and Emerson, Nabatchi and Balogh (2012) seeks to understand these issues and challenges and identify the social and process conditions required for effective collaborative governance.

== Social applications ==
Collaborative governance has been used to address many complex social, environmental and urban planning issues, including: flood crisis management and urban growth management in Australia; community visioning and planning in New Zealand; and public participation in the redesign of the Ground Zero site in New York.

In the UK, the USA and countries across much of Western Europe, governments have attempted to shift the focus towards various forms of co-production with other agencies and sectors and with citizens themselves in order to increase civic participation. The classic forms of hierarchical governance and representative democracy are seen as inefficient when it comes to engaging citizens and making them a part of the decision making process. Large projects and initiatives require involvement and communication with not only citizens but partnerships with other government and non-government agencies and, in some instances, international cooperation with foreign governments and organizations. For example, managing the growing number of official and non-official crossings of the US-Mexico border has required input from all levels of US and Mexican governments, multiple government agencies (like U.S. Forest Services and U.S. Border Patrol), land management, and other non-federal agencies for social affairs. All of these parties had to communicate and collaborate to address issues of border security and protecting natural resources. As a result, the U.S. Border Patrol and Forest Services successfully enacted the terms of the 2006 memorandum of understanding, creating inter-agency forums, increasing field coordination and joint operations, and constructing fences and other tactical infrastructure.

Governing and managing large and growing metropolitan urban areas, covering numerous local governments and various levels of State and National governments, provides many governance challenges and opportunities. Abbott has reviewed metropolitan planning in South East Queensland (SEQ), Australia where collaborative governance arrangements, between State and local governments and the regional community, have evolved over a 20-year period leading to positive outputs and outcomes.

The positive outputs and outcomes of collaborative governance and metropolitan planning in SEQ have been extensive and broad and extend well beyond statutory regional land use planning.

These include: three endorsed non-statutory regional plans; two endorsed statutory regional plans; an infrastructure program linked to the State budget; regional sectoral plans for transport, water supply, natural resource management, etc.; new legislation and institutional arrangements for metropolitan governance; and capital works such as the SEQ busway network.

India

The Government of India launched the Integrated Child Development Services (ICDS) program in 1975 to ensure appropriate growth and development of all children but this implementation was weak. To improve, in the city of Mumbai, they partnered up with a non-profit Society for Nutrition, Education and Health Action (SNEHA), to build a child nutrition program for care and prevention of acute malnutrition. This partnership also included the Municipal Corporation of Greater Mumbai (MCGM) to team up with their Nutritional Rehabilitation and Research Centre (NRRC) at Lokmanya Tilak Municipal General Hospital. The collaboration between SNEHA, a non-state actor, and ICDS and MCGM, state actors, led to what is considered the only large-scale successful program that implemented community- based approaches to identify, treat, and prevent wasting in urban informal settlements of India.

== See also ==
- Governance
- Open source governance
- Collaborative leadership
- Collaborative e-democracy
