= IserveU =

Canadian web-based voting platform

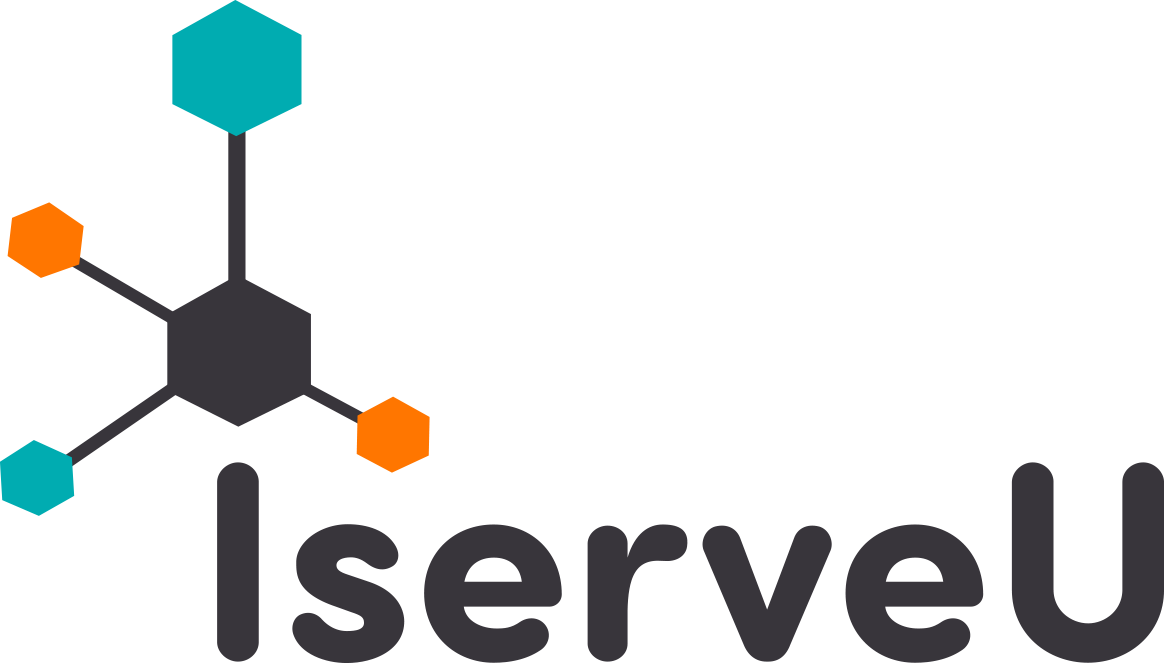
The IserveU logo

IserveU is a non-profit, direct democracy organization and web-based voting platform founded in Yellowknife, Northwest Territories, Canada. The organization's stated aims are to increase local engagement in governance through crowdsourcing decision-making to the voting public.

== Formation ==
Initially conceived in 2012 by Paige Saunders, it was intended to introduce a form of e-democracy to Yellowknife. IserveU has since become a web-based voting platform and volunteer organization, that organizes public events and canvassing. In a letter from one of the organization's founding members, it is stated that before the election, IserveU operated through volunteers and a small staff.

== Voting platform ==
The IserveU voting platform functions as a way to incorporate elements of direct democracy into a representative system by obligating city council incumbents to vote in accordance with the outcome of online votes.

Councilors seeking greater citizen input into decision-making post all current motions before the council, on the IserveU site. These motions could be detailed, debated, and voted on by the registered userbase before the outcome is taken to council. Councilors themselves can vote on issues with the weight of the currently 'uncast' votes. That is, the outcome of a motion with very little public participation will largely be decided by the councilors' votes, as the votes in the uncast vote pool are equally divided between them. A motion that has garnered a large amount of public participation will have fewer uncast votes for the councilors to use, reducing the councilors' impact.

The system is still being modified to meet new concerns and has been released under an open source license on GitHub.

== Inauguration ==
On 19 October 2015, Rommel Silverio, who is associated with the platform, was elected into the council in Yellowknife, Mr. Silverio entered office for a three-year term starting on November 2, 2015.
