= Party for Accountability, Competency and Transparency =

Party for Accountability, Competency and Transparency Parti pour la Responsabilisation, la Compétence et la Transparence
- Party Leader: Michael Nicula
- Founder: Michael Nicula
- Founded: October 1, 2010; November 5, 2012 (registered)
- Dissolved: July 31, 2016
- Headquarters: Toronto
- Membership: 1,000+ (May 20, 2011)
- Ideology: Participatory democracy Democratic socialism Left-wing nationalism Canadian republicanism
- Political position: Centre-left to left-wing
- International affiliation: E2D International
- Colours: red

Website
- votepact.ca

The Party for Accountability, Competency and Transparency (French: Parti pour la Responsabilisation, la Compétence et la Transparence, abbreviated as PACT), formerly the Online Party of Canada (French: Parti Canadien en ligne, abbreviated as OPC), was a Canadian website and federally registered political party founded in October 2010. The party was founded by Michael Nicula of Toronto. The party was deregistered by Elections Canada on July 31, 2016.

== Founding and governing principles ==
The Party for Accountability, Competency and Transparency was a non-partisan political party founded on the principles of participatory e-democracy where members voted directly on specific issues via the party website and, in return, party officials (candidates) must support the majority position on every issue, regardless of their personal position.

To ensure accountability, all PACT representatives wrote up their own Promissory Letter of Resignation before being eligible to run for office. Any PACT representative who votes against the will of the majority could be asked to resign.

== Political platform ==
The Party for Accountability, Competency and Transparency did not have a set agenda. The political platform was a compilation of issue positions from the OPC website, voted from members and grouped by issue category, e.g., economic, healthcare, environment, etc. The key aspect of the platform is the importance given to certain categories; however, particular issues and respective positions are determined solely based on members’ votes.

== Membership ==
Unlike most recognized political parties, all eligible voters in Canada, including members of other federal political parties, are allowed and strongly encouraged to become members of PACT in order to cast votes and comment on issues. In this sense, PACT is more like to a virtual House of Commons of Canada, representing all political stripes, rather than a traditional political party.

To ensure that each voting citizen only casts a single vote on each issue, only members' votes count toward the official party position and members are only authenticated once a signed paper form, recognized by Elections Canada, is submitted to the PACT. Through this process, every PACT member and their respective electoral district as voting citizens is verifiable through the National Register of Electors, similar to the voter identification process followed by Elections Canada during Federal Elections.

== Election results ==
Results by election
Election	Candidates	# of votes	% vote	% vote in contested ridings
2015 general election	1	90	0.001%	0.165%

Results by riding
Election	Riding	Candidate's Name	Votes	%	Rank
2012 by-election	Durham	Michael Nicula	132	0.39	6/6
2013 by-election	Toronto Centre	Michael Nicula	43	0.12	10/11
2015 general election	Spadina—Fort York	Michael Nicula	90	0.17%	5/6

== See also ==
- Direct democracy
- E-democracy
- Pirate Party of Canada
