= Liquid democracy =

Combination of direct and representative democracy

Liquid democracy is a form of proxy voting, whereby an electorate engages in collective decision-making through direct participation and dynamic representation. This democratic system uses elements of both direct and representative democracy. Voters in a liquid democracy have the right to vote directly on all policy issues à la direct democracy; voters also have the option to delegate their votes to someone who will vote on their behalf à la representative democracy. Any individual may be delegated votes (those delegated votes are termed "proxies") and these proxies may in turn delegate their vote as well as any votes they have been delegated by others resulting in "metadelegation".

This delegation of votes may be absolute (an individual divests their vote to someone else across all issues), policy-specific (an individual divests their vote to someone only when the vote concerns a certain issue), time-sensitive (an individual decides to divest their vote for a period of time), or not utilized by voters. In the case of absolute delegation, the voter situates themselves as a participant in a representative democracy; however, they have the right to revoke their vote delegation at any time. The appeal of the retractability mechanism stems from an increased accountability imposed on representatives. In policy-specific delegation, voters may also select different delegates for different issues. Voters may select representatives they feel are more equipped to adjudicate in unfamiliar fields due to elevated expertise, personal experience, or another indicator of competence. Moreover, automatic recall allows citizens to be as engaged in political affairs as the rest of their lives permit. A voter may delegate their vote completely one week but decide to participate fully another. For those who wish to exercise their right to vote on all political matters, liquid democracy provides the flexibility to retain the option of direct democracy.

Illustration of delegated voting. Voters to the left of the blue line voted by delegation. Voters to the right voted directly. Numbers are the quantity of voters represented by each delegate, with the delegate included in the count.

Most of the available academic literature on liquid democracy is based on empirical research rather than on specific conceptualization or theories. Experiments have mostly been conducted on a local-level or exclusively through online platforms, however policy examples are listed below.

== Origins ==
In 1884, Charles Dodgson (more commonly referred to by his pseudonym Lewis Carroll), the author of the novel Alice in Wonderland, first envisioned the notion of transitive or "liquid" voting in his pamphlet The Principles of Parliamentary Representation. Dodgson expounded a system predicated on multi-member districts where each voter casts a single vote or possesses the ability to transfer votes akin to the modern concept of liquid democracy. Bryan Ford in his paper "Delegative Democracy" says this could be seen as the first step towards liquid democracy.

The first institutionalized attempts at liquid democracy can be traced back to the work of Oregon reformer William S. U'Ren. In 1912, he lobbied for interactive representation (the Proxy Plan of Representation), where the elected politicians' influence would be weighted with regard to the number of votes each had received.

A few decades later, around 1967, Gordon Tullock suggested that voters could choose their representatives or vote themselves in parliament "by wire", while debates were broadcast on television. James C. Miller favored the idea that everybody should have the possibility to vote on any question themselves or to appoint a representative who could transmit their inquiries. Soon after Miller argued in favor of liquid democracy, in 1970 Martin Shubik called the process an "instant referendum". Nonetheless, Shubik was concerned about the speed of decision-making and how it might influence the time available for public debates.

In the 21st century, based on the work of Jabbusch and James Green-Armytage, technological innovation has made liquid democracy more feasible to implement. The first online liquid democracy applications originated in Berlin, Germany following political disillusionment and the emergence of hacker culture. Since liquid democracy gained traction in Germany, variations of liquid democratic forms have developed globally in political and economic spheres (examples listed at the bottom of the article).

== Delegative form ==
The prototypical liquid democracy has been summarized as containing the following principles:

1. Choice of role: members of the democracy can either passively act as an individual or actively act as a delegate. This is different from representative democracies, which only use specific representatives. This way, delegates can be selective about their participation in different areas of policy.
2. Low barrier to participation: delegates do not have much difficulty becoming delegates. Most notably, they do not have to win competitive elections that involve costly political campaigns.
3. Delegated authority: delegates act in processes on behalf of themselves and of individuals who choose them as their delegate. Their power to make decisions varies based on their varying support.
4. Privacy of the individual: all votes by individuals are kept secret to prevent any form of coercion by delegates or other individuals.
5. Accountability of the delegates: in contrast to the privacy of the individuals, the formal decisions of delegates are typically made public to their voters and the broader community to hold them accountable for their actions.
6. Specialization by re-delegation: delegates are able to have both general authorities delegated to them from individual voters and specialized authority re-delegated to them from other delegates to work on their behalf.

Variations on this general model also exist, and this outline is only mentioned here for orientation within a general model. For example, in the "Joy of Revolution", delegates are left open to being specialized at the time of each individual's delegation of authority. Additionally, general principles of fluidity can often be applied to the concept such that individuals, for example through the single transferable vote, can revise their vote at any time by modifying their registered delegation, sometimes called "proxy" with the governing organization.

== Contrasted with proxy voting ==
Liquid democracy utilizes the foundation of proxy voting but differs from this earlier model in the degree of scale. Unlike proxy voting, liquid democratic votes may be delegated to a proxy and the proxy may delegate their votes (individual and proxies) to an additional proxy. This process is termed "metadelegation". Though an individual's vote may be delegated numerous times, they retain the right to automatic recall. If someone who delegated their vote disagrees with the choices of their representative or proxy, they may either vote themselves or select another delegate for the next vote.

== Contrasted with representative democracy ==
Crucial to the understanding of liquid democracy is the theory's view of the role of delegation in representative democracy. Representative democracy is seen as a form of governance whereby a single winner is determined for a predefined jurisdiction, with a change of delegation only occurring after the preset term length. In some instances, terms can be cut short by a forced recall election, though the recalled candidate can win the subsequent electoral challenge and carry out their term. The paradigm of representative democracy is contrasted with the delegative form implemented in liquid democracy. Delegates may not have specific limits on their term as delegates, nor do they represent specific jurisdictions. Some key differences include:

1. Optionality of term lengths.
2. Possibility for direct participation.
3. The delegate's power is decided in some measure by the voluntary association of members rather than an electoral victory in a predefined jurisdiction. (See also: Single transferable vote.)
4. Delegates remain re-callable at any time and in any proportion.
5. Often, the voters have the authority to refuse observance of a policy by way of popular referendum overriding delegate decisions or through nonobservance from the concerned members. This is not usually the case in representative democracy.
6. Possibility exists for differentiation between delegates in terms of what form of voting the member has delegated to them. For example: "you are my delegate on matters of national security and farm subsidies."

In contrast to representative democracy, within liquid democracy, delegations of votes are transitive and not dependent on election periods. The concept of liquid democracy describes a form of collective decision-making, which combines elements of direct democracy and representative democracy through the use of software. This allows voters to either vote on issues directly, or to delegate their voting power to a trusted person or party. Moreover, participants are empowered to withdraw their votes at any time.

Voting periods can go through many stages before the final votes are computed. Also, when voters make use of the delegation option, the delegators are able to see what happened to their vote, ensuring the accountability of the system. The fact that delegators can revoke their votes from their representative, is another significant aspect of how liquid democracy can potentially refine contemporary representative democracy concepts.

By allowing to revoke votes at any time, society can replace representatives who are not providing ideal results and choose more promising representatives. In this way, voters are enabled to effectively choose the most appropriate or competent topic-specific representatives and members of a community or electorate, in real-time, can shape the well-being of their commons, by excluding undesired decision-makers and promoting the desired ones. The voting software LiquidFeedback for instance, through its connotation of liquidity, accounts to this real-time aspect, potentially providing a constantly changing representation of the voting community's current opinion.

Regarding objective-technological elements among liquid democracy software examples, it is reasonable to determine that they originally were not developed with an intention to replace the current and firmly established processes of decision-making in political parties or local governments. Based on academic research, it is significantly rather the case that liquid democracy software possesses the intrinsic function to contribute additional and alternative value to the processes of traditional elections, channels of communication and discussion, or public consultation.

== Contrasted with direct democracy ==
Direct democracy is a form of democracy where all collective decisions are made by the direct voting contributions of individual citizens. Liquid democracy is a sort of voluntary direct democracy in that participants can be included in decisions (and are usually expected to be, by default) but can opt out by way of abstaining or delegating their voting to someone else when they lack the time, interest, or expertise to vote on the delegated matter. By contrast, in direct democracy, all eligible voters are expected to stay knowledgeable on all events and political issues, since voters make every decision on these political issues.

== Potential setbacks ==
Liquid democracy may naturally evolve into a type of meritocracy with decisions being delegated to those with knowledge on or personal experience of a specific subject. Nonetheless, in the admittedly few issues where there exists a clear "ground truth" or "correct answer", Caragiannis and Micha concluded a subset of supposedly more informed voters within a larger populace would be less adept at identifying the ground truth than if every voter had voted directly or if all votes had been delegated to one supreme dictator.

Bryan Ford explains that some of the current challenges to liquid democracy include the unintended concentration of delegated votes due to large numbers of people participating in platforms and decision making; building more secure and decentralized implementation of online platforms in order to avoid unscrupulous administrators or hackers; shortening the thresholds between voter privacy; and delegate accountability.

=== Oligarchic tendencies ===
Similar to electoral political systems, the concept of "distinction" is of central importance. Rather than empowering the general public, liquid democracy could concentrate power into the hands of a socially prominent, politically strategic, and wealthy few. Helene Landemore, a Political Science professor at Yale University, describes this phenomenon as "star-voting" in particular. Thus, apparently, the normative ideal of meritocracy may herein always devolve into mere oligarchy. She goes on to argue in this vein that individuals should have a right of permanent recall whereby voters who have delegated their vote to another individual may, at any time, retract their delegation and vote autonomously. However, the ability to automatically recall one's vote regarding any policy decision leads to an issue of policy inconsistency as different policies are voted on by different subsets of society.

=== Scale ===
In large nation states with millions of voting citizens, it is likely the body of "liquid representatives" (those who have been delegated other citizen votes) will be significant. Consequently, deliberation and representation become pertinent concerns. To achieve meaningful deliberation, the liquid representatives would have to be split into numerous groups to attain a somewhat manageable discussion group size. As for representation, liquid democracy suffers from a similar issue facing electoral representative democracies where a single individual embodies the will of millions. Some may argue that such is universally undesirable. Most of the aforementioned moral intuitions may easily be serve as a reductio to today's more coarse-graining representative democracies as well. The diagram on the right illustrates one possible implementation of liquid democracy working at a national scale. Furthermore, the risk of cyclical delegations (e.g., Alice delegates her vote to Bob, who delegates his vote to Alice, and neither show up) increases with the number of voters.

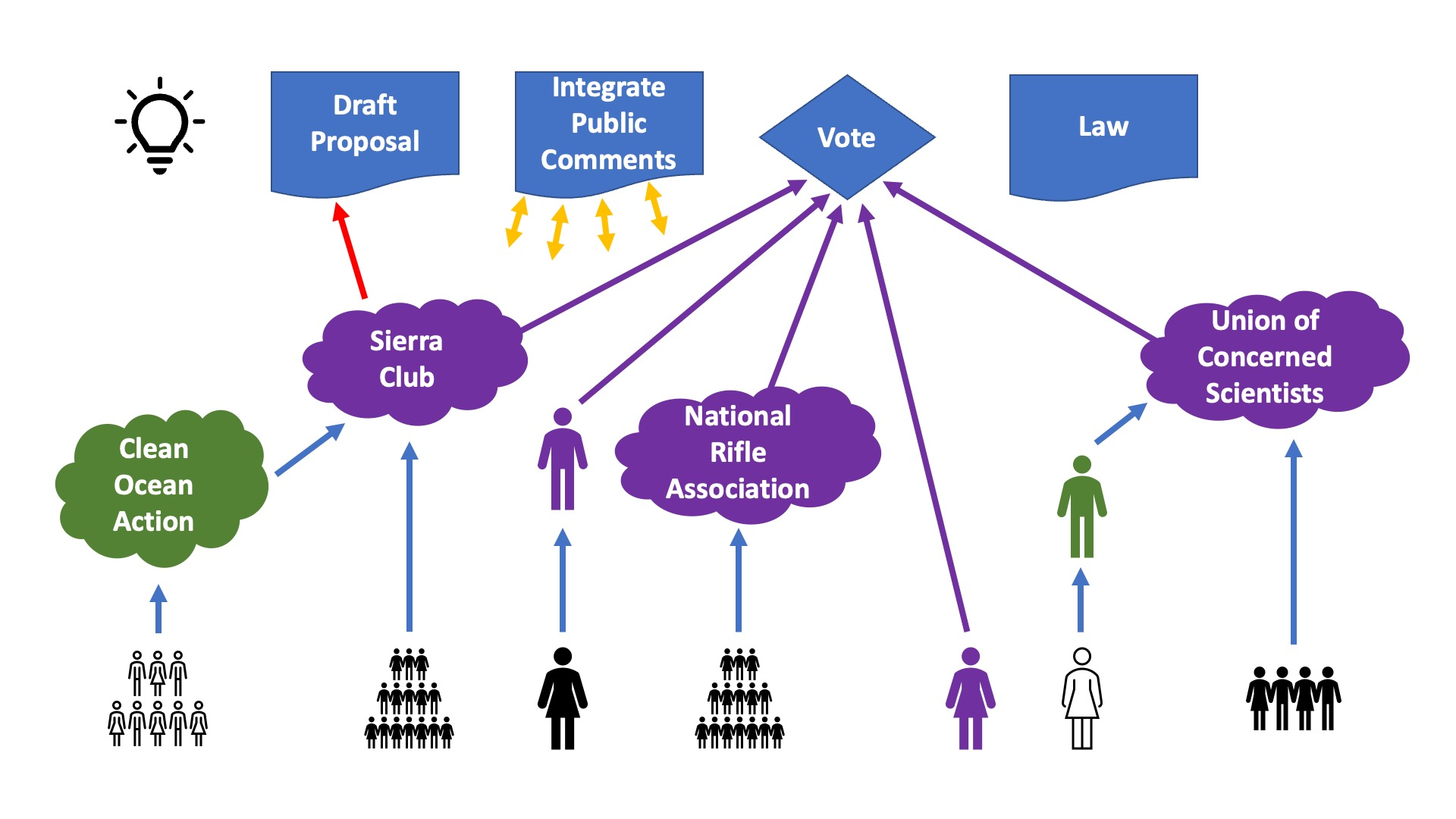
Liquid Democracy engaging voters at a national scale

=== Internet access and participation ===
While the number of people without internet access has declined in recent years, significant gaps persist. In the United States 96% of all adults reported using the internet as of 2024. The remaining 4% may be unable to access the internet or may simply choose to stay offline. Regardless of the reason, those without internet usage cannot participate a voting system that requires online connectivity.

== Examples ==
=== Google Votes ===
Google experimented with liquid democracy through an internal social network system known as Google Votes. This liquid democratic experiment constitutes one of the less common corporate examples. Users of the existing Google+ platform were the voters and built-in discussion functions provided the deliberative element. In this instance, Google Votes was used to select meal offerings. Nonetheless, researchers came away with a number of recommendations regarding future implementations of liquid democracy on online platforms including delegation recommendations based on prior choices, issue recommendations based on prior participation, and delegation notifications to inform voters about their relative power.

=== Pirate Parties ===
Pirate Parties, parties focusing on reducing online censorship and increasing transparency, first came around in Sweden in the year 2006. Pirate Parties in Germany, Italy, Austria, Norway, France and the Netherlands use liquid democracy with the open-source software LiquidFeedback.

Specifically in the case of the Pirate Party in Germany, the communication with citizens uses tools and platforms similar to conventional parties – including Facebook, Twitter, and online sites – however, they developed the "piratewiki" project. This is an open platform opened to collaborative contributions to the political deliberative process. "Liquid Feedback" was the platform used by the German Pirate Party since 2006, which allowed users to become a part of inner party decision-making process.

=== Argentina ===
Into the 2010s, virtual platforms have been created in Argentina. Democracia en Red is a group of Latin Americans who seek a redistribution of political power and a more inclusive discussion. They created Democracy OS, a platform which allows internet users to propose, debate and vote on different topics. Pia Mancini argues that the platform opens up democratic conversation and upgrades democratic decision making to the internet era.

=== Demoex / Direktdemokraterna ===
The first example of liquid democracy using a software program in a real political setting involved the local political party Demoex in Vallentuna, a suburb of Stockholm: the teacher Per Norbäck and the entrepreneur Mikael Nordfors used software called NetConference Plus. This software is no longer supported after the bankruptcy of the manufacturing company, Vivarto AB. The party had a seat in the local parliament between 2002−2014, where the members decide how their representative shall vote with the help of internet votations. Since then, Demoex and two other parties have formed Direktdemokraterna.

=== Civicracy ===
An experimental form of liquid democracy called Civicracy was tested at the Vienna University of Technology in 2012. It created a council of representatives based on a continuous vote of confidence from participants, similar to modern parliaments. The relative liquidity of votes was lessened by a dampening algorithm intended to ensure representation stability. Despite extensive planning, the real-world experiment was not conducted due to a lack of favorability.

=== LiquidFriesland ===
The district of Friesland in Germany has implemented some usage of a platform called LiquidFriesland, but it has not succeeded in radically changing the mode of governance there. The platform, designed as a form of Liquid Democracy, has achieved mixed results

The implementation and the use of the LiquidFriesland platform was clearly dominated by the bureaucratic style of communication and working procedures. The citizen participation on the platform was inscribed in the hierarchical structure, where suggestions on the platform were regarded as inputs for the bureaucratic black box, but by no means as part of the decision-making process inside it. The communication with main stakeholders – the users of the platform – was being structured according to the same logic and was not rebuilt in the course of the project.

No regulation was planned to be initially adapted to allow local politicians to conduct the process of legal drafting on the LiquidFriesland platform. As for the delegation aspect of LiquidFriesland, it has never been specified in any regulatory documents. No more than 500 citizens registered on LiquidFriesland and activated their accounts. Only 20% of the activated users logged in to the platform and only 10% have shown some activity on LiquidFriesland.

== See also ==
- Decidim
- Delegated voting
- Collaborative filtering, which applies the same principle to information filtering rather than voting
- Delegate and trustee models of representation
- E-democracy
- E-governance
- Indirect election
