= Online Protection and Enforcement of Digital Trade Act =

Unpassed United States bill

- Acronyms (colloquial): OPEN Act

Legislative history
- Introduced in the Senate as S. 2029 by Ron Wyden (D–OR) on December 17, 2011; Committee consideration by Senate Finance Committee

The Online Protection and Enforcement of Digital Trade Act (OPEN Act) is a bill introduced in the United States Congress proposed as an alternative to the Stop Online Piracy Act and PROTECT IP Act, by Senator Ron Wyden of Oregon, a Democrat, and Representative Darrell Issa of California, a Republican. The text of the bill is available for public comment at keepthewebopen.com .

Wyden first introduced OPEN in the Senate (S. 2029) on December 17, 2011, with co-sponsors Jerry Moran of Kansas and Maria Cantwell of Washington. Issa and 25 co-sponsors introduced OPEN in the House (H.R. 3782) on January 18, 2012. The Senate bill has been referred to the Finance Committee, and the House bill has been referred to the Judiciary Committee.

On January 14, 2012, in response to two White House petitions, White House technology officials Victoria Espinel, Aneesh Chopra, and Howard Schmidt stated: "Any effort to combat online piracy must guard against the risk of online censorship of lawful activity and must not inhibit innovation by our dynamic businesses large and small...We must avoid creating new cybersecurity risks or disrupting the underlying architecture of the Internet."

== Comparison with SOPA and PIPA/PROTECT IP Act ==
The OPEN Act was proposed as an alternative to the PROTECT IP Act (PIPA), which was approved by the United States Senate Judiciary Committee in May 2011, and the closely related Stop Online Piracy Act (SOPA), which was introduced by House Judiciary Chairman Lamar Smith (R-TX) in November. After an initial description on December 2 as an outline of possible approaches written by a bipartisan group of eleven lawmakers, a draft text was made public on December 8, 2011, in advance of a House Judiciary markup of the SOPA Act the following week. The OPEN Act seeks to stop transfers of money to foreign websites whose primary purpose is piracy or counterfeiting, whereas SOPA and PIPA also seek to require Internet providers and search engines to redirect users away from viewing the sites. The PROTECT IP Act proposed to do this by blocking domain name resolution, whereas SOPA imposes a broader requirement for network providers to "prevent access by its subscribers located within the United States" including blocking by IP address and possibly deep packet inspection.

OPEN places enforcement responsibility on the United States International Trade Commission (ITC), which currently adjudicates patent-related disputes, rather than the United States Justice Department. The ITC would be given power to collect fees from complainants and to hire additional personnel for investigations.

Proponents of the OPEN Act describe it on the KeepTheWebOpen website as a way to protect the rights of artists like SOPA and PROTECT IP, but differing from its rivals by not introducing new internet police powers or undermining calls for open internet in closed societies, and by protecting legitimate internet businesses, social media, legitimate websites and internet innovation. They say that their proposal, but not its rivals, ensures that intellectual property cases will be resolved by intellectual property experts, and will target the actual criminals running foreign rogue websites. They criticize SOPA, but not PROTECT IP, for failing to apply due process to judging websites.

== Reception ==
The OPEN draft is backed by Web companies such as Google and Facebook, whereas SOPA and PIPA are backed by the movie and music industries.

The Consumer Electronics Association commended the sponsors of the bill, calling it "a quick, effective way to shut down pirate sites without damaging legitimate companies or enriching trial lawyers". The bill was also praised by the Computer and Communications Industry Association. Google copyright counsel Fred von Lohmann said for his company, "We think following the money, the money that supports foreign rogue sites, is a sensible place to start. It was quite successful in offshore gambling...We've been very clear with members of the committee that we support that".

The OPEN draft was strongly opposed by the Motion Picture Association of America (MPAA). The MPAA's vice president of global policy and external affairs, Michael O'Leary, wrote in the MPAA's blog that the bill "allows companies profiting from online piracy to advocate for foreign rogue websites against rightful American copyright holders. It even allows notification to some of these companies if they want to help advocate for rogue websites". The MPAA rejects any law that fails to block Americans' access to The Pirate Bay, a BitTorrent tracker which survived prosecution in its home country of Sweden and steadfastly refuses to remove information about infringing downloads from its search index. Darrell Issa maintains that the OPEN act could be effective against the site by targeting even overseas ad networks placing ads on the site, though it is possible that the site could survive without advertisements.

The Electronic Frontier Foundation (EFF) wrote that the legislation "addresses many of the most glaring flaws in both SOPA and PIPA" but stated that it is continuing to review and analyze the draft. Public Knowledge deemed the bill a "marked improvement" that would avoid the "vigilante justice" of its rivals. Center for Democracy and Technology senior policy counsel Eric Sohn said that the bill's definitions "appear to carefully target true bad actors—the ones who are willfully fostering widespread infringement--while excluding general purpose platforms and social networking services", whose financial focus would "starve those bad actors of their financial lifeblood, rather than pursuing the futile and costly approach of messing with the Internet's addressing system".

Copyright Alliance executive director Sandra Aistars called the OPEN Act "impractical for individual artists and creators", who would be required to argue in Washington before the trade commission rather than in their home jurisdictions, during a period of up to 18 months. The process would be much faster, however, for sites that fail to reply and participate in the ITC process, according to Issa, who note that the ITC has a "rocket docket" in which cases are heard more quickly than any federal court. Writing in the Huffington Post, Aistars argued that the bill placed more obstacles for individual artists than for corporate litigants seeking patent remedies before the ITC, saying that fees proposed for complainants in the action were "unprecedented" and incompatible with "justice for all", while third parties profiting from the infringement could argue for the decision to be overturned by the Administration without paying any fee. She further stated that the hearing officers assigned to hear cases by the bill were not required to have intellectual property expertise, and that the evidentiary requirement for a site owner to "willfully" commit infringement would be a mental state impossible to prove for rogue operators refusing to consent to U.S. jurisdiction.

Professor Eric Goldman of the Santa Clara University School of Law reviewed the bill in detail for Ars Technica, finding it "flawed, but more salvageable" than "SOPA's disgustingly blatant rent-seeking" and praising the bill's due process features and a focus on foreign trade policy. However, Goldman also warned that the burden on U.S.-based payment service providers and ad networks could drive business to foreign competitors and permit domestic and foreign legal action simultaneous with the ITC administrative proceeding, or other abuses.

Forbes ran a column denouncing the bill as "politically untenable" and "not a viable alternative because it is a transparent attempt to return a several year effort back to square one, while also entangling it with thorny and debilitating congressional jurisdictional turf battles and even thornier and glacial trade policy politics."

Nonetheless, in support of OPEN, The New York Times, in an editorial, notes "[OPEN] gives copyright holders powerful new tools to protect themselves. And it goes a long way toward addressing the concerns of Internet companies, protecting legitimate expression on the Web from overzealous content owners".

== Public comment using Madison ==
The call for public comment on the draft was described by CNET as "the Wiki-fication of part of the legislative process". Site visitors can read the text of the bill and suggest specific edits on Madison, described as a "digital legislative platform that lets anyone suggest changes to the draft bill, a Wikipedia of sorts for legislative text".

== Supporters ==
The following members of Congress support the Online Protection and Enforcement of Digital Trade Act.

=== Senate ===
- Maria Cantwell (D-WA)
- Jerry Moran (R-KS)
- Mark Warner (D-VA)
- Ron Wyden (D-OR)

=== House ===
- John Campbell (R-CA)
- Jason Chaffetz (R-UT)
- Lloyd Doggett (D-TX)
- Mike Doyle (D-PA)
- Anna Eshoo (D-CA)
- Blake Farenthold (R-TX)
- Darrell Issa (R-CA)
- Michael Honda (D-CA)
- Zoe Lofgren (D-CA)
- Doris Matsui (D-CA)
- Jared Polis (D-CO)
- Jackie Speier (D-CA)
- Mike Thompson (D-CA)
- Tim V. Johnson (R-IL)
- Pete Stark (D-CA)
- James Langevin (D-RI)
- Patrick McHenry (R-NC)
- George Miller (D-CA)
- Dennis Ross (R-FL)
- Jim Sensenbrenner (R-WI)
- Alcee Hastings (D-FL)
- Spencer Bachus (R-AL)
- Keith Ellison (D-MN)
- Raul Grijalva (D-AZ)
- Peter DeFazio (D-OR)
- Lynn Woolsey (D-CA)
