= LiquidFeedback =

Software

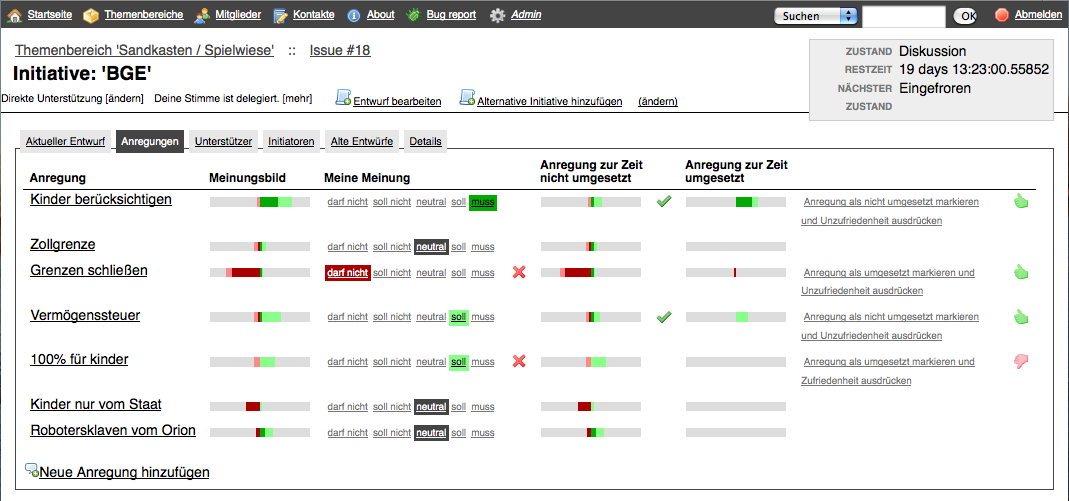
- Developer: Public Software Group
- Written in: Lua, PL/pgSQL
- License: MIT License
- Website: www.liquidfeedback.org
- Repository: www.public-software-group.org/mercurial/liquid_feedback_core

LiquidFeedback is free software for political opinion formation and decision-making. The software aims to incorporate insights from social choice theory to aggregate opinions more effectively. Among its main features is the implementation of liquid democracy.

== Description ==
LiquidFeedback helps groups (such as societies or organizations, political or not) make decisions inclusively, without the limitations of traditional governance methods. It also differs from a general Internet forum by providing a proposition development process that integrates deliberation and voting. LiquidFeedback was originally designed for political parties and other organizations, but has evolved to be used in civic contexts as well. It aims to create an accurate representation of the opinions of the group's members, without them being distorted by social hierarchies and knowledge differences. Each individual is encouraged to promote his or her own initiatives within the scope set by the operators. This scope may be the democratic self-organization of the group or the submission of proposals to elected representatives.

The online platform allows participants to vote on matters themselves. In addition, participants are given the option to delegate their vote to a selected individual if they feel that individual is better suited to make the decision. The purpose of this is to allow those who are most knowledgeable about a particular topic to make the decision. Since not everyone is equally invested in all issues, one participates in what they are interested in, but for other areas one gives their vote to someone acting on their behalf. This mechanism is known as liquid democracy and allows for a division of labor among participants. This helps to produce results that reflect the mood of the majority, even if they cannot find the time to participate in person, thus avoiding problems that regularly arise with grassroots democracy.

LiquidFeedback allows participants not only to vote on initiatives, but also to help improve them. The platform allows users to interact with each other to improve initiatives and gain the necessary majority. In addition to the standard bottom-up (member- or citizen-initiated) process, LiquidFeedback offers a "polling mode" that allows public administrations to consult constituents on proposed actions.

== Features ==
This demonstrates the user's ability to delegate votes to others using LiquidFeedback.

LiquidFeedback focuses on combining deliberation and voting in an integrated process of informed decision making. The software is designed to enable democratic self-organization of defined medium to large groups, such as associations and political parties. It is also used to power participatory platforms to promote civic engagement. To this end, it combines a number of features.

=== Proposition development process ===
The proposition development process can be summarized as follows:

- user driven, self organized process (collective moderation, no request commission necessary)
- every member can start an initiative
- assessed constructive feedback (support, suggestions, implementation assessment)
- initiators decide about implementation
- no fundamental opposition within an initiative
- every member can start an alternative initiative
- alternative initiatives define the issue and are voted upon together using Schulze's method

The process has four phases:

- Admission - measure if there is significant interest in discussing a topic (called "issue")
- Discussion - improve initiatives, weigh pros and cons, consider alternatives
- Verification - identify viable voting options, protect against political hacks (last minute changes will not go unnoticed)
- Voting - determine the winning initiative

The first three phases generate the set of feasible ballot options. These are then voted on.

=== Policies ===
To allow different values for process timing (duration of the phases) and supporter quorums, and to allow the possibility of supermajority requirements for certain decisions, LiquidFeedback allows its users to have so-called "policies" for different kinds of decisions. The results can be used for information, suggestion, directive, or as binding decisions depending on the organizational needs and the national legislation.

=== Liquid democracy ===
The ability to transfer votes to more knowledgeable users can stand out as a benefit because everyone wants what is best for their community. Parties using LiquidFeedback have demonstrated that vote delegation is a solution to creating a better society. Only LiquidFeedback allows votes to be transferred without the need for an extreme reason. The ability to transfer votes without an excuse needed benefits all by making sure the decision needed by society is not hindered by those that do not know everything about a proposal.

"When you give members of an organization more direct influence, some critical questions arise: Does everyone want to be involved in every issue? What if people are interested in different areas? It's clear that people will have different choices about which issues to have a direct say or representation on. Fortunately, liquid democracy offers a dynamic solution to this dilemma. Basically, you participate in what you are interested in, but for other areas, you give your vote to someone who will act in your interest. In addition, liquid democracy supports the self organization of all factions and subgroups, whether defined by gender, ethnic identity, or even values. Ultimately, liquid democracy allows everyone to participate directly whenever they see fit, without placing too much burden on the participants. ... Originally, the focus of liquid democracy was on voting. In designing the LiquidFeedback process, we realized that transitive proxies (or liquid democracy) could be used for both deliberation and voting. Consequently, LiquidFeedback uses transitive proxies for participant empowerment during structured deliberation, collective moderation, identification of viable voting options, and final preferential voting."

— Andreas Nitsche at the National Coalition for Equity Impact Summit #2 in Santa Monica, California

Another remarkable feature of the liquid democracy implementation in LiquidFeedback is that default power structures emerge. On different levels there are default delegations, as a fall-back solution. On the other hand, a participant can become active at any time, which automatically suspends the respective delegations. These characteristics lead to the fact that the delegation behavior of the participants and thus the (often topic specific) power structures, are subject to learning effects. Interaktive Demokratie published a video on liquid democracy and how it works in LiquidFeedback. "WATCH: Liquid Democracy Explained" (video). youtube.com. Interaktive Demokratie e. V. Sep 14, 2021.

=== Deliberation ===
The purpose of the deliberation in LiquidFeedback is to allow participants to better understand the pros and cons of a proposal (called an "initiative" in LiquidFeedback). During deliberation, proposals can be improved based on suggestions from other participants. It is also possible to work on alternative proposals that address the same issue. Preference aggregation algorithms ensure that minority positions get a fair share of attention based on the number of participants who support them. The same mechanism protects against overrepresentation of vocal groups. Deliberation takes place during the LiquidFeedback process phases of admission, discussion, and verification.

=== Collective moderation ===
The LiquidFeedback process does not need a moderator with special rights. Instead, the entirety of all participants' actions can be construed as collective moderation. Some publications call this approach algorithmic moderation. The process encourages constructive behavior and is contingent upon a majority of participants being in favor of constructive debate. It is not necessary for this majority to be in agreement with one another with regard to the issues under discussion.

=== Preferential voting ===
LiquidFeedback successfully determines what voters want by using the "Schulze mathematical method", which takes into account how people perceive a situation rather than a simple yes or no. This provides a more accurate depiction of how people see certain situations.

Utilizing the Schulze Method enables individuals to express their genuine preferences without the need to evaluate which alternative has the best chances of winning. In other words, the presence of similar ideas in different options neither benefits nor harms the original idea, ultimately avoiding any encouragement for tactical voting. If there is only one initiative without alternative initiatives, LiquidFeedback voting becomes a binary decision where participants simply choose between approving the initiative and maintaining the status quo.

=== Protection of minorities ===
LiquidFeedback provides several mechanisms to allow a proportional representation of minority positions. Although decisions are ultimately made by majorities (see also: Majority rule), the software allows

- minorities and even individuals to present their point of views,
- minorities to get attention according to their actual site (as measured by current support).

The sorting of competing initiatives, for example, is conducted through the Harmonic Weighting algorithm, which employs the identical counting scheme utilized in Thiele's elimination method. The same mechanism is used to prevent vocal groups from causing harm to other minority groups, by ensuring that they do not appear to be more significant than they actually are.

=== Decentralized operation ===
In July 2018, the first prototype of a decentralized LiquidFeedback was released by the Association for Interactive Democracy. The software, which uses a consensus-finding algorithm between nodes based on a proof-of-stake scheme, is called LiquidFeedback Blockchain. In a publication, they discuss a roadmap to a decentralized LiquidFeedback, including decentralized accreditation, and the practical implications of Arrow's theorem for open electronic voting in a decentralized setting.

== History ==
LiquidFeedback was co-written by Andreas Nitsche, Jan Behrens, Axel Kistner and Bjoern Swierczek. The software incorporates the concepts of Liquid Democracy, Proposition development process, Preferential voting or the Schulze method, and Interactive Democracy into the operation of the software. The software was first published in October 2009 by Public Software Group e. V. after being suggested by some members of Germany's Pirate Party unsatisfied with conventional means of political opinion formation. Despite this motivation, its developers are fully independent from the users of the software and they allow the software's usage by other parties and organizations. The first stable version of its back end was released in April 2010.

In June 2010, the developers of LiquidFeedback founded Interaktive Demokratie e.V., an independent and non-partisan research institute. Interaktive Demokratie aims to conduct research and facilitate scientific collaboration in the realm of digital democracy. The Public Software Group remains the publisher of LiquidFeedback, while commercial services associated with the platform are offered by a for profit company. According to the LiquidFeedback website, there are commercial offers with regard to LiquidFeedback. Software "editions" can be tailored to meet the needs of different organizations and business settings.

The Pirate Party Germany Berlin became the first political party to utilize the platform in January 2010 for a state party conference. LiquidFeedback assisted in the development of new statutes for the branch during this time, which prompted other state branches in Germany to follow suit. In order to link branches and committees within an organization, LiquidFeedback introduced organizational units. In 2014, the Pirate Party Germany Berlin revised its bylaws: a "Permanent General Assembly" held using LiquidFeedback was granted organizational status to adopt enforceable resolutions. The software has been successfully used for the preparation of several national conventions by the Pirate Parties of Germany, Austria, Italy, Switzerland and Brazil.

Political parties utilize LiquidFeedback to implement Liquid Democracy. The technology used has provided direction for how the party makes decisions on issues. Feedback from users allows party officials to know what the people want while also allowing for people's opinions. It can be used to make sure everyone in the party has a vote and that their voice is heard. Some people may not be quite as passionate about an issue than others which is accounted for by the ability to delegate votes. The countries mentioned in the paragraph above all have similar forms of Liquid Democracy that stem from the software of LiquidFeedback.

The initial implementation of LiquidFeedback for public engagement occurred in Friesland County, Germany, in September 2012. At the county's proposal, administrative procedures were established to seek input from citizens on pre-existing county council proposals. Subsequent municipalities and counties adopted Friesland County's model. EU-funded projects have also used LiquidFeedback for participatory actions in Athens, London, Paris, Turin, and San Donà di Piave in Metropolitan Venice.

== Technical specifications ==
The front end is written in Lua while the back end is written in PL/pgSQL. Both parts are released under the MIT License. There is also an API available which allows external applications to add additional features to the program.

== Criticism ==
The implementation of LiquidFeedback led to heated discussion among the members of the German Pirate Party: Defenders of data protection criticized the software's ability to match each statement and vote to its individual author, although that was the intention. Because the software only allows for voting by a recorded vote, it is easily possible to identify the participants' political opinions by their voting behavior. This improves the transparency of the political process as it makes any special interest openly visible.

By allowing communities to discuss bills in hope for change, political preferences can emerge at times. People may want to keep such information close to them and, in turn, can become deterred from the idea of voting using LiquidFeedback's software. Non-secret decision making in general comes with a huge problem when it comes to the integrity of the election. If someone were to give their vote to another user not because they think that they are more knowledgeable on a subject but because they received some sort of benefit, the election would lose purity. Due to the uncertainty behind the reasons people actually give their vote to another user, rigging of an election can never be known. However, this also applies to any other open ballot voting scheme. Even though votes are transparent, it has been questioned whether this prevents corrupt people from becoming super-voters who hold much power. The transparency of the voting may also deter certain citizens from wanting to vote. Some citizens want their political decisions to remain private as they fear other people may judge them based on their decision. Normal elections allow citizens to keep their political preferences private whereas LiquidFeedback demonstrates transparency when it comes to this in order to make sure users are who they say they are.

Some have argued that the ability to delegate votes could create and enforce power structures, even though delegations can be withdrawn at any time. The authors of the program later introduced an option for the organisation to activate automatic removal of inactive users.

== See also ==
- Liquid democracy
- Schulze method
- German Pirate Party
- E-democracy
- Radical transparency
- Participatory culture and technology
- Participatory democracy
- Collaborative e-democracy
- Civic engagement
- Supermajority
- Proxy Voting
- Direct Democracy
- Grassroot Democracy
- Blockchain
