= Collaborative e-democracy =

Political concept of an online, participatory policymaking process

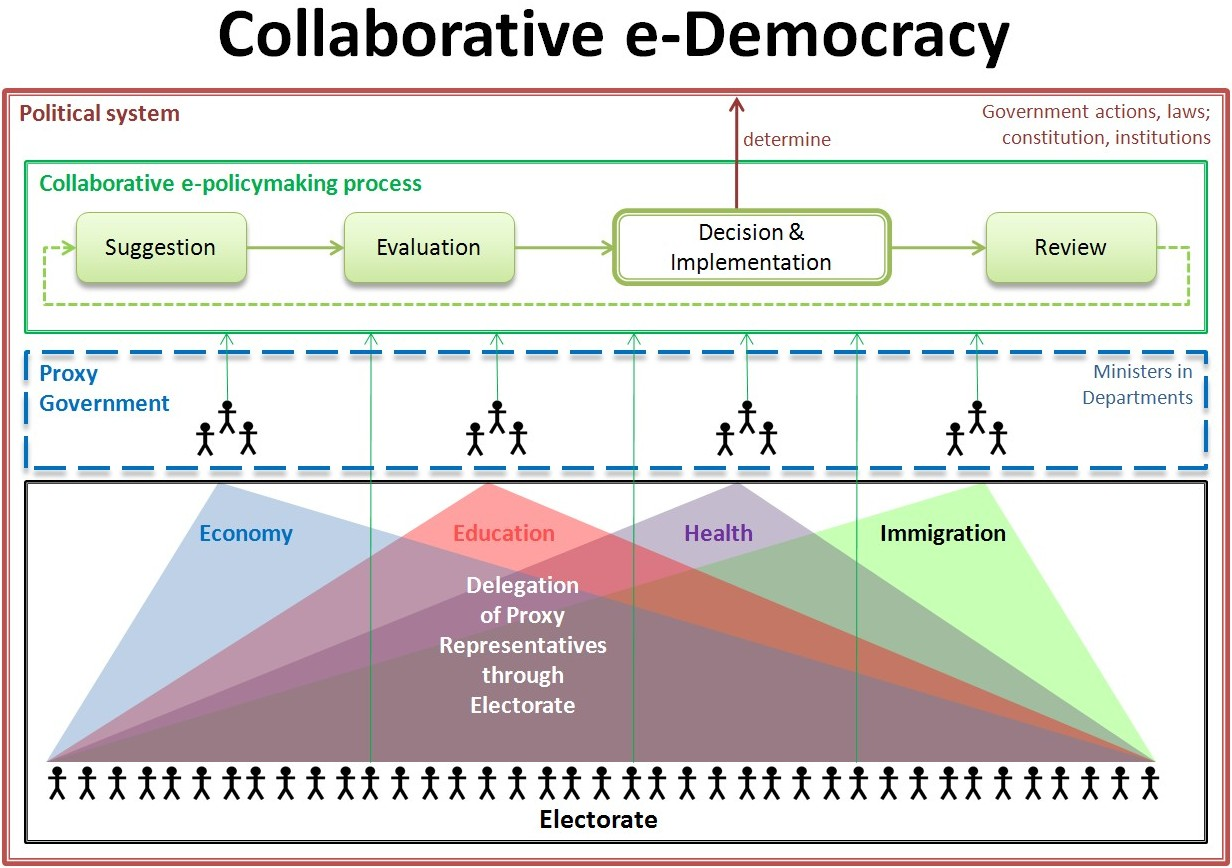
Schematic of a collaborative e-democracy, showing the pathways of citizen participation either directly or through proxy representatives within diverse policy domains.

Collaborative e-democracy refers to a hybrid democratic model combining elements of direct democracy, representative democracy, and e-democracy (or the incorporation of ICTs into democratic processes). This concept, first introduced at international academic conferences in 2009, offers a pathway for citizens to directly or indirectly engage in policymaking. Steven Brams and Peter Fishburn describe it as an "innovative way to engage citizens in the democratic process," that potentially makes government "more transparent, accountable, and responsive to the needs of the people."

Collaborative e-democracy is a political system that enables governmental stakeholders (such as politicians, parties, ministers, MPs) and non-governmental stakeholders (including NGOs, political lobbies, local communities, and individual citizens) to collaborate in the development of public laws and policies. This collaborative policymaking process occurs through a government-sanctioned social networking site, with all citizens as members, thus facilitating collaborative e-policy-making. Michael Gallagher suggests that it can be a "powerful tool that can be used to improve the quality of decision-making." Andrew Reynolds even believes that "collaborative e-democracy is the future of democracy."

In this system, directly elected government officials, or ‘proxy representatives’, would undertake most law and policy-making processes, embodying aspects of representative democracy. However, citizens retain final voting power on each issue, a feature of direct democracy. Furthermore, every citizen is empowered to propose their own policies and, where relevant, initiate new policy processes (initiative). Collaboratively formulated policies, considering the views of a larger proportion of the citizenry, may result in more just, sustainable, and therefore, implementable outcomes. As Steven Brams and Peter Fishburn suggest, "collaborative e-democracy can help to ensure that all voices are heard, and that decisions are made in the best interests of the community." They argue that this can lead to "more just and sustainable outcomes."

Collaborative e-democracy can also help to improve the quality of decision-making, as noted by Michael Gallagher, who states, "By involving a wider range of people in the decision-making process, collaborative e-democracy can help to ensure that decisions are made on the basis of sound evidence and reasoning." Gallagher further proposes that this collaborative approach can contribute to "more sustainable outcomes."

Andrew Reynolds posits that "Collaborative e-democracy can help to make government more responsive to the needs of the people. By giving citizens a direct say in the decision-making process, collaborative e-democracy can help to ensure that government is more accountable to the people. This can lead to more implementable outcomes, as decisions are more likely to be supported by the people." Additional references support the idea that collaborative e-democracy can lead to more just, sustainable, and implementable outcomes.

== Theoretical Framework ==
Collaborative e-democracy encompasses the following theoretical components:

- Collaborative Democracy: A political framework where electors and elected officials actively collaborate to achieve optimal solutions using technologies that facilitate broad citizen participation in government.
- Collaborative e-Policymaking (CPM): A software-facilitated, five-phase policy process in which citizens participate either directly or indirectly via proxy representatives. This process unfolds on a government-backed social networking site, with all citizens as members. Each member can propose issues, evaluate and rank other members' suggestions, and vote on laws and policies that will affect them. In a broader context, CPM is a universal process that could enable every organization (e.g., businesses, governments) or self-selected group (e.g., unions, online communities) to co-create their own regulations (such as laws or codes of conduct) and strategies (e.g., governmental actions, business strategies), involving all stakeholders in the respective decision-making processes.
- Proxy voting and Liquid Democracy: In a collaborative e-democracy, the system takes into account the limitations of direct democracy, where each citizen is expected to vote on every policy issue. Recognizing that this could impose an excessive burden, collaborative e-democracy allows citizens to delegate voting power to trusted representatives, or proxies, for issues or domains where they lack the time, interest, or expertise for direct participation. Despite this delegation, the original citizen maintains final voting power on each issue, amalgamating the benefits of both direct and representative democracy on the social networking platform.

== Policy Process ==
Collaborative e-democracy engages various stakeholders such as affected individuals, domain experts, and parties capable of implementing solutions in the process of shaping public laws and policies. The cycle of each policy begins with the identification of a common issue or objective by the collective participants - citizens, experts, and proxy representatives. As Steven Brams and Peter Fishburn argue, "collaborative e-democracy can help to ensure that all voices are heard, and that decisions are made in the best interests of the community."

- Suggestion & Ranking Phase: Participants are prompted to offer policy solutions aimed at resolving the identified issue or reaching the proposed goal, a method known as policy crowdsourcing. Subsequently, these suggestions are ranked with those having the most support taking precedence. This process, according to Michael Gallagher, helps to "improve the quality of decision-making" by involving a wider range of people, ensuring that "decisions are made on the basis of sound evidence and reasoning."
- Evaluation Phase: For each top-ranking proposal (i.e., law or government action), pros and cons of its implementation are identified, enabling the collective to assess how they might be impacted by each policy. Independent domain experts assist this evaluation process.
- Voting Phase: Based on the collectively created information, the group votes for the proposal perceived as the most optimal solution for the identified issue or goal. The outcome of this phase may result in the introduction of a new law or execution of a new government action. As Andrew Reynolds notes, giving citizens a "direct say in the decision-making process... can lead to more implementable outcomes, as decisions are more likely to be supported by the people."
- Revision Phase: A predetermined period post-implementation, the collective is consulted to ascertain whether the policy enacted was successful in resolving the issue or attaining the goal. If the policy is deemed successful, the cycle concludes; if not, the process reinitiates with the suggestion phase until a resolution is reached.

Note that as a software process, CPM is automated and conducted on a governmental social networking site.

== Principles ==
Collaborative e-democracy operates on several key principles:

- Self-government and Direct Democracy: Collaborative e-democracy is grounded in the ideal of self-governance and direct democracy. It embodies the ancient Roman law maxim, quod omnes tangit ab omnibus approbetur, which translates to “that which affects all people must be approved by all people.” This stands in stark contrast to representative democracy, which is often influenced by corporate lobbies (Corporatocracy).
- Open source governance: This philosophy promotes the application of open source and open content principles to democracy, enabling any engaged citizen to contribute to policy creation.
- Aggregation: The social networking platform plays a role in gathering citizens' opinions on different issues, such as agreement with a specific policy. Based on these common views, ad hoc groups may form to address these concerns.
- Collaboration: The platform also encourages collaboration of like-minded individuals on shared issues, aiding the co-creation of policy proposals within or between groups. Groups with contrasting strategies or perspectives but similar goals can compete with each other.
- Collective intelligence: The CPM process leverages collective intelligence — a group intelligence emerging from aggregation, collaboration, competition, and consensus decision-making. This collective intelligence helps identify issues and co-create solutions beneficial for most people, reflecting the design pattern of Web 2.0.
- Collective Learning & Adoption: The direct democracy aspect of collaborative e-democracy shifts policymaking responsibility from government teams (top-down) to the citizen collective (bottom-up). The repercussions of their decisions initiate a collective learning process. Collaborative e-democracy, being flexible and adaptable, integrates learning experiences quickly and adjusts to new social, economic, or environmental circumstances. This principle mirrors 'Perpetual Beta,' another design pattern of Web 2.0.

== Benefits and Limitations ==
Collaborative e-democracy aims to bring forth several benefits:

- Transparency and Accessibility: The CPM process aspires to provide transparency and make governmental operations accessible to all citizens via the internet.
- Political efficacy: Engaging citizens in governmental processes could heighten political efficacy and help counter the democratic deficit.
- Deliberation: The governmental social networking site, serving as the primary platform for political information and communication, could enhance deliberation quality among the nation's various governmental and non-governmental stakeholders.
- Collective Awareness: Large-scale online participation could boost public awareness of collective problems, goals, or policy issues, including minority opinions, and facilitate harnessing the nation's collective intelligence for policy development.

However, collaborative e-democracy has its limitations:

- Constitutional Constraints: Many democratic nations have constitutional limits on direct democracy, and governments may be reluctant to surrender policymaking authority to the collective.
- Digital divide: People without internet access could be at a disadvantage in a collaborative e-democracy. Traditional democratic procedures need to remain available until the digital divide is resolved.
- Majority rule: As in most democratic decision processes, majorities could overshadow minorities. The evaluation process could provide advance notice if a minority group would be significantly disadvantaged by a proposed policy.
- Potential for Naive Voting: Voters may not have comprehensive understanding of the facts and data related to their options, leading to votes that do not represent their actual intentions. However, the system's included proxy voting/delegation, coupled with potential improvement in education, critical thinking, and reasoning skills (potentially fostered by a better form of government and internet usage), should help mitigate this issue. Additionally, the CPM process incorporates proxies and experts to educate people on policy implications before decisions are made.

== Research and Development ==
The concepts of collaborative e-democracy and collaborative e-policy-making were first introduced at two academic conferences on e-governance and e-democracy in 2009. The key presentations were:

- Petrik, Klaus (2009). “Participation and e-Democracy: How to Utilize Web 2.0 for Policy Decision-Making.” Presented at the 10th International Digital Government Research Conference: "Social Networks: Making Connections between Citizens, Data & Government" in Puebla, Mexico.
- Petrik, Klaus (2009). “Deliberation and Collaboration in the Policy Process: A Web 2.0 Approach.” Presented at The 3rd Conference on Electronic Democracy in Vienna, Austria.
- An additional publication appeared in the "Journal of eDemocracy and Open Government", Vol 2, No 1 (2010).

== See also ==
- Democracy
  - Consensus democracy
  - Deliberative democracy
  - Direct democracy
  - Inclusive democracy
  - Liquid democracy
  - Participatory democracy
  - Representative democracy
- E-democracy
  - Civic technology
  - Online petition
  - Electronic voting
  - E-rulemaking
  - Mass collaboration
  - Online deliberation
  - Open-source governance
- Web 2.0
  - Crowdsourcing
  - E-participation
  - Social networking site
