= E-democracy =

Use of information and communication technology in political and governance processes

E-democracy (a mix of the words electronic and democracy), also known as digital democracy or Internet democracy, uses information and communication technology (ICT) in political and governance processes. While associated with e-voting, e-democracy also expands to other levels of political discussion which include engagement between public organizations and people, offering information online to a wider audience and also facilitating political agendas online. The term is commonly attributed to digital activist Steven Clift. E-democracy closely follows e-government and applies ICT to help enhance the quality of voting services, public opinion polling and provide access to the broader populace.

== Structure ==
E-democracy uses digital media to such as television, radio, the Internet, cell phones, and electronic polling systems to involve more people in political discourse.

== History ==
The earliest use of e-democracy dates back to the development of Minnesota E-Democracy Project in July 1994 by then student Steven Clift of Hubert H. Humphrey Institute of Public Affairs. The project at first primarily was used to access information from the candidates and info about the candidates running for office in the upcoming state and national election later in the year. Using help by Twin Cities Freenet and the Minnesota Regional Network, the website was opened in August of the same year to the general public. Early use of listserv and Hypermail was also integrated in the website.

In Italy, teledemocracy was introduced in Bologna in 1995 with the introduction of the project Iperbole (Hyperbole). The project was aimed at the population of the city (half a million) that gave free Internet access for a small fee. Access to online forums, discussion groups, and municipal services were provided by Cineca and co-funded by the EU. In 1999, the Ministry of University and Research and Cineca carried out the first virtual European-wide election to elect around 30,000 professors and researchers using smart electronic cards.

In the European Parliament, OVIDE (Organisation du Videotex du Député Européen) started as a concept in the mid-1980s, especially after the 1979 European Parliament election. The service was branched at communication and information. Among the features for both include electronic mail invitations, allowing mailing lists, request for parliamentary allowances in the form of electronic forms, legislative procedure fact sheets, Eurostat statistics and gateways to other EU databases. The multilingual service was also first European online services to present information in both Videotex and ASCII modes.

== Concept and approach ==
The concept of e-democracy uses information and communication technologies (ICT) in representative democracy to engage communities in political participation. Digital forums are able to foster civic engagement, personal perspectives, and contribute to policy discussions without the need for physical interactions. Easy access and comprehension of media platforms are also used to voice opinions, gather information, and mobilize other people to take part in decision making and problem solving. Media platforms can also help political candidates anayzle voter data and engage with voters while managing internal party coordination.

Given that we were collecting so much data around the country and we have got various smart people who can analyse the data, why didn’t the smart people pick up we were in trouble in Telford, Vale of Clwyd, and dare I say it in Ed Balls’ seat? I want to find out why that happened … It feels like the Labour frontbench is further away from our members than at any point in our history and the digital revolution can help bring the party closer together.

— Tom Watson

== Digital mobilization in social movements ==
=== The Arab Spring ===
During the 2010–11 Arab Spring, applications like Bambuser and Ustream were used by demonstrators and protesters to livestream videos, share inside information and bypass government restrictions to view the outside world. Citizen journalism played a major part in foreign media such as Associated Press to report undergoing conflicts within the area.

=== Occupy movement ===
The Occupy movement significantly used radical transparency against corporations and political elites. By livestreaming and "live-tweeting" internal meetings movements, the movement also gave transparency to anyone to join the movement. In its peak, the movement managed to cover 82 countries around the world as it grew from social media such as Facebook and X.

=== 15-M Movement ===
While mostly being an assembly-based movement, the 15-M Movement (or Los Indignados) began to use the media to communicate their own narratives and drew inspiration from other movements at the time, including the Arab Spring, the Kitchenware and Wikileaks. Figures associated with the movement include Ada Colau and Pablo Iglesias, with the latter forming the Podemos party. The media particularly helped in mobilising more people towards the movement. In 2016, Decidim was developed as a response to this movement.

=== Nepalese election ===
Sudan Gurung, founder of Hami Nepal, announced "Youths Against Corruption", a Discord channel aimed at providing communication for youths during the September 2025 protests. The channel was a response after the government imposed bans on major social media website including YouTube, Facebook and X (formerly Twitter) on early in the month on 4 September. A Discord poll was set to elect a new interim prime minister after the resignation of K.P. Sharma Oli. Sushila Karki was then elected, before being succeeded by Balen Shah.

== Advantages ==
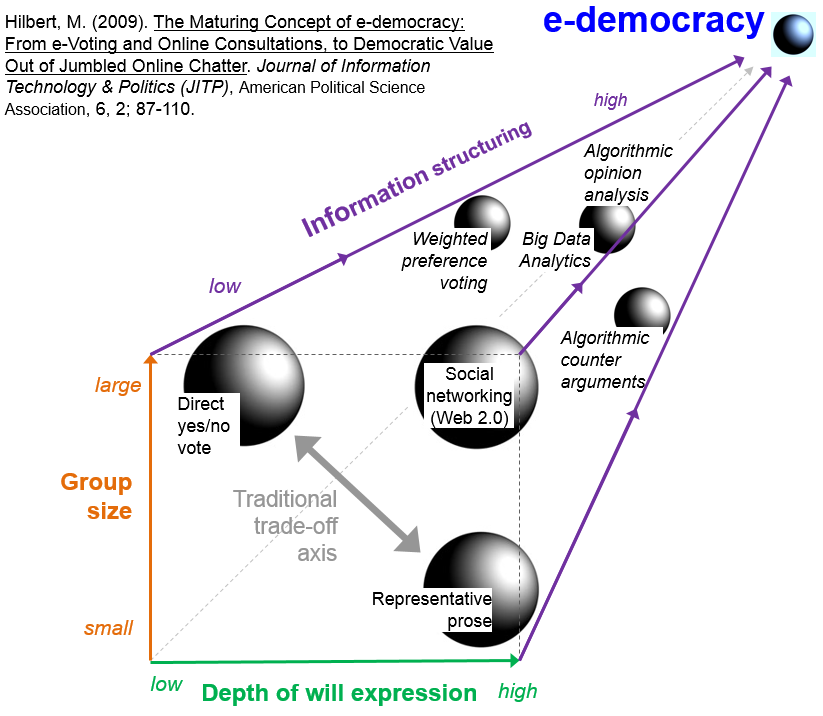
3D e-democracy roadmap by Hilbert

E-democracy allows more freedom of expresion, free access to information online and increase transparency in the government.

E-democracy also increases participation among voters by allowing public dialogue and disccusion to occur using technology such as electronic mailing lists, blogs and online forums.

Social media platforms such as Facebook and YouTube helps with engaging large audiences through user-friendly interfaces and makes discussion easier.

=== Civic involvement ===
The Internet helps to aid civic engagement by allowing individuals to interact in their communities over shared moral and cultural agreements to prioritize the common value over individual interests.

Proponents of e-democracy propose that it can help more active government engagement and inspire citizens to actively influence decisions that directly affect them. Digital tools have and continue to be used to determine the best practices for getting citizens involved in government. Collecting data on what gets citizens involved most efficiently allows for stronger practices going forward in citizen involvement.

Many studies report an increased use of the internet for obtaining political information. From 1996 to 2002, the number of adults who reported that the internet was significant in their choices increased from about 14 to 20 percent.

A survey conducted by Philip N. Howard found that nearly two-thirds of the adult population in the United States has had some experience with online political news, information, or other content over the past four election cycles.

The ease with which information can be accessed online may empower citizens to better understand government and politics. By providing access to contact information, legislation, agendas, and policies, governments can enhance transparency, thereby potentially facilitating more informed participation both online and offline.

According to Matt Leighninger, the internet impacts government in two main ways, empowering individuals, and empowering groups of people.

The Organisation for Economic Co-operation and Development (OECD) lists three main factors when it comes to ICTs promoting civic engagement. The first of these is timing; most of the civil engagement occurs during the agenda-setting in a cycle. The second key factor is tailor; this refers to the idea of how ICTs are changing in order to allow for more civic engagement. The last of these factors is integrations; integration is how new ICTs are combining the new technological ways with the traditional ways in order to gain more civic engagement.

ICT creates the opportunity for a government that is simultaneously more democratic and more expert by creating open online collaboration between professionals and the general public. The responsibility of gathering information and making decisions is shared between those with technological expertise and those who are professionally considered the decision-makers. Greater public participation in the collaboration of ideas and policies makes decision-making is more democratic. ICT also promotes the idea of pluralism (sociology)pluralism within a democracy, bringing new issues and perspectives.

=== Youth involvement ===
Youths belonging to Generation X and Generation Y, typically encompassing those aged 35 and below as of the mid-2000s, were noted for their lack of political interest and activity. Electronic democracy has been suggested as a possible method to increase voter turnout, democratic participation, and political knowledge in youth.

=== Deliberative democracy ===
The Internet also plays a central role in deliberative democracy, where deliberation and access to multiple viewpoints is central in decision-making. One application of e-democracy in the deliberative process is the California Report Card. This tool was created by the Data and Democracy Initiative of the Center for Information Technology Research in the Interest of Society at the University of California, Berkeley, in collaboration with Lt. Governor Gavin Newsom.

The Online Protection and Enforcement of Digital Trade Act (OPEN Act), presented as an alternative to SOPA and PIPA, has the support of major companies like Google and Facebook. Its website, Keep The Web Open, not only provides full access to the bill but also obtains public input in which over 150 modifications have been made through user contributions.

== Disadvantages ==
=== Internet accessibility ===
The e-democratic process is hindered by the digital divide between active participants and those who do not participate in electronic communities. Advocates of e-democracy may advocate government moves to close this gap.

=== Security and privacy ===
Through a SWOT analysis, that the risks of an e-government are related to data loss, privacy and security, and user adoption.

=== Opposition ===
Information and communications technologies can be used for both democratic and anti-democratic purposes. For instance, digital technology can be used to promote both coercive control and active participation.

Objections to direct democracy are argued to apply to e-democracy, such as the potential for direct governance to tend towards the polarization of opinions, populism, and demagoguery.

=== Cybersecurity ===
Given the inability to-date to secure any internet traffic from interference and manipulation, the potential of e-democracy for decision-making remains limited with most experts opposed to using the internet for widespread voting.

=== Internet censorship ===
In a nation with heavy government censorship, e-democracy could not be utilized to its full extent. Governments often implement internet crackdowns during widespread political protests. In the middle-east in 2011, for example, the multiple cases of internet blackouts were dubbed the "Arab Net Crackdown". Libya, Egypt, Bahrain, Syria, Iran, and Yemen are all countries whose leaders implemented complete censorship of the internet in response to the plethora of pro-democracy demonstrations in their respective nations. These lockdowns were primarily put in place in order to prevent the leakage of cell phone videos that contained images of the violent government crackdown on protesters.

=== Social media manipulation ===
The adaptability and openness of social media may allow political entities to manipulate it for their own ends. Authorities could use social media to spread authoritarian practices in several ways including intimidating opponents, monitoring private conversations, and even jailing those who voice undesirable opinions, flooding online spaces with pro-regime messages, disrupting signal access to hinder the flow of information and banning globalized platforms and websites.

=== Populism concerns ===
In a study conducted that interviewed elected officials in Austria's parliament, opinions were widely and strongly against e-democracy. They believed that the citizens were uninformed and that their only way of expressing their opinions should be to vote; sharing opinions and ideas was strictly the job of the elected.

=== Stop Online Piracy Act ===
The introduction of H.R. 3261, the Stop Online Piracy Act (SOPA), in the United States House of Representatives, was believed to have been an attack on internet democracy by many internet users.

SOPA was indefinitely postponed following widespread protests, which included a site blackout by websites like Wikipedia on 18 January 2012.

In India, when the country's Communication and IT Minister Kapil Sibal suggested that offensive content may be privately "pre-screened" before being allowed on the Internet with no rules for redressal. However, more recent news reports quote Sibal as saying that there would be no restrictions whatsoever on the use of the Internet.

== See also ==
- Collaborative e-democracy
- Democratization of technology
- E2D International
- E-Government
- E-participation
- Electronic civil disobedience
- Electronic Democracy Party, a political party in Turkey
- eRulemaking
- Hacktivism
- Internet activism
- Isocracy
- IserveU, a Canadian-based online voting platform
- Media democracy
- Online Party of Canada, a political party in Canada
- Parliamentary informatics
- ParoleWatch
