= Progressive Era =

1890s–1920s US political reform movement

- 1890s–1921
Gilded Age; Greater Reconstruction	World War I Roaring Twenties
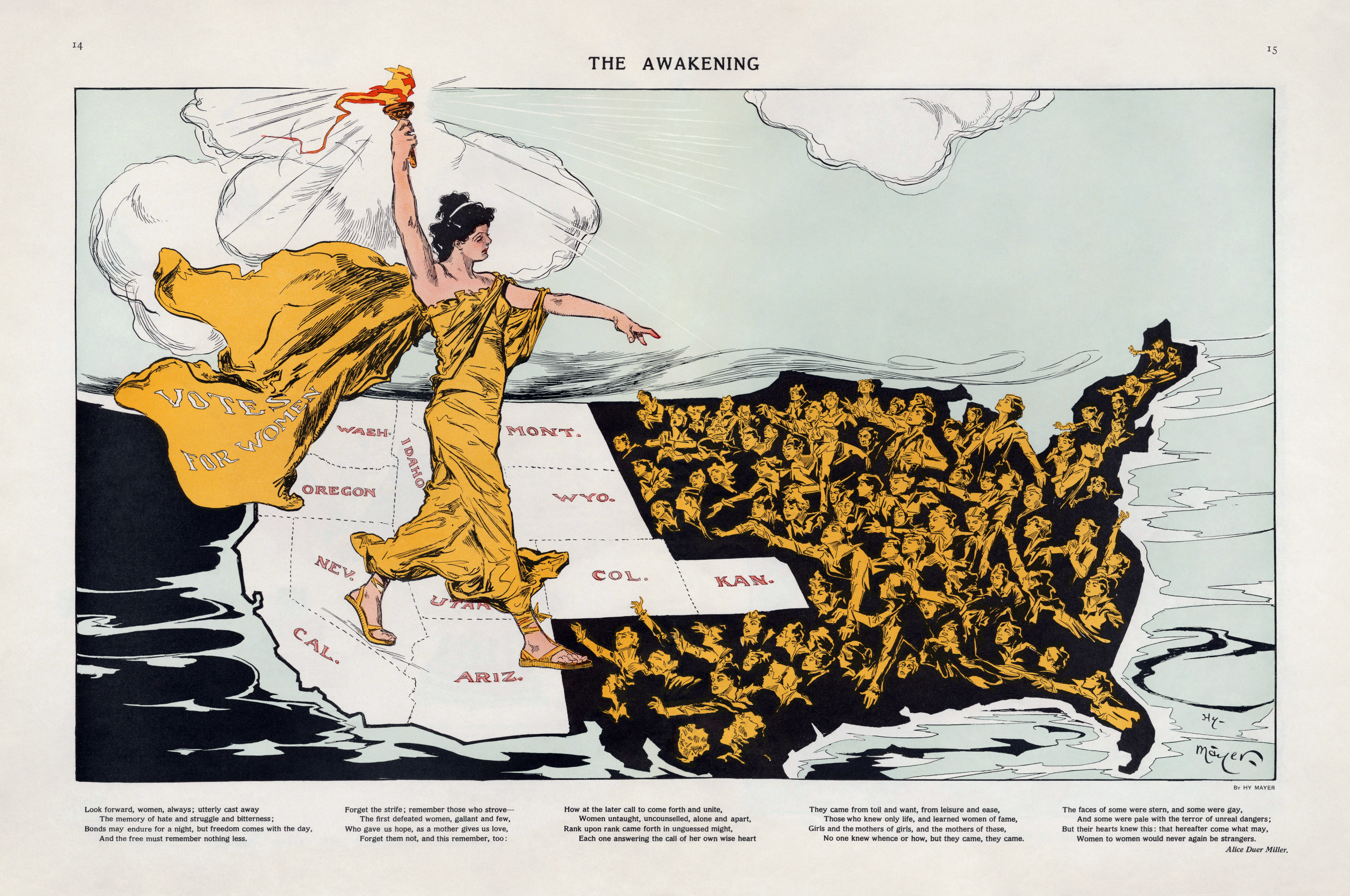
- The Awakening: "Votes for Women" in 1915 Puck magazine
- Location: United States
- Including: Fourth Party System
- President(s): William McKinley; Theodore Roosevelt; William Howard Taft; Woodrow Wilson; Warren G. Harding
- Key events: Nadir of American race relations Trust-busting; Women's suffrage Initiative and referendum Square Deal

The Progressive Era (1890s–1920s) was a period in the United States characterized by multiple social and political reform efforts. Reformers during this era, known as Progressives, sought to address issues they associated with rapid industrialization, urbanization, immigration, and political corruption, as well as the loss of competition in the market due to trusts and monopolies, and the great concentration of wealth and political power among a very few individuals. Reformers expressed concern about slums, poverty, and labor conditions. Multiple overlapping movements pursued social, political, and economic reforms by advocating changes in governance, scientific methods, and professionalism; regulating business; protecting the natural environment; and seeking to improve urban living and working conditions.

Corrupt and undemocratic political machines and their oligarch bosses were a major target of progressive reformers. To revitalize democracy, progressives established direct primary elections, direct election of senators (rather than by state legislatures), initiatives and referendums, and women's suffrage (which was promoted to advance democracy and bring the presumed moral influence of women into politics). For many progressives, prohibition of alcoholic beverages was key to eliminating corruption in politics as well as improving social conditions.

Progressives also targeted monopolies, which they worked to regulate through trustbusting and antitrust laws with the goal of promoting fair competition, and advocated new government agencies focused on regulation of industry. Other goals were using scientific, medical, and engineering solutions to reform government and education, and fostering improvements in fields including medicine, finance, insurance, industry, railroads, and churches. Progressives aimed to professionalize the social sciences, especially history, economics, and political science, and improve efficiency with scientific management (Taylorism).

Initially, the movement operated chiefly at the local level, but later it expanded to the state and national levels. Progressive leaders were often from the educated middle class, and various progressive reform efforts drew support from lawyers, teachers, physicians, ministers, business people, and the working class.

== Originators of progressive ideals and efforts ==
Certain key groups of thinkers, writers, and activists played key roles in creating or building the movements and ideas that came to define the shape of the Progressive Era.

=== Sullivan's book: Initiative and referendum ===
Inspiration for the initiative movement was based on the Swiss experience. New Jersey labor activist James W. Sullivan had an interest in the direct legislation process of Switzerland, and visited the country in 1888. After this, he wrote a series of detailed articles about the Swiss government for the New York Times, which then became the first several chapters of his 1893 book: Direct Legislation by the Citizenship Through the Initiative and Referendum. Sullivan's book became a template for reformers pushing the same ideas. He suggested that using the initiative would give political power to the working class and reduce the need for strikes. Sullivan's book was first widely read on the left, as by labor activists, socialists and populists. William U'Ren was an early convert who used it to build the Oregon reform crusade. By 1900, middle-class "progressive" reformers everywhere were studying it.

=== Muckraking: exposing corruption ===
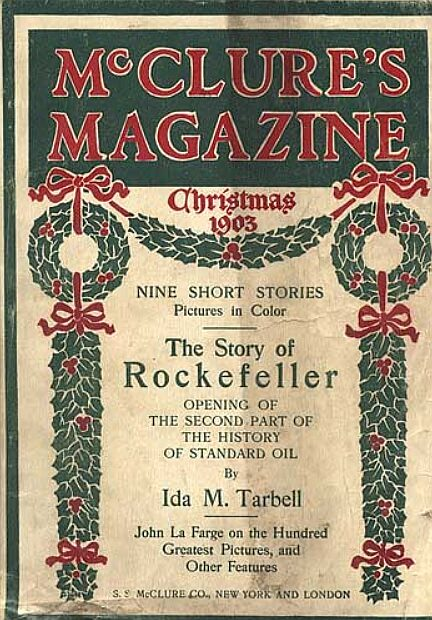
Christmas 1903 cover of McClure's features a muckraking exposé of Rockefeller and Standard Oil by Ida Tarbell.

Magazines experienced a boost in popularity in 1900, with some attaining circulations in the hundreds of thousands of subscribers. In the beginning of the age of mass media, the rapid expansion of national advertising led the cover price of popular magazines to fall sharply to about 10 cents, lessening the financial barrier to consume them. Another factor contributing to the dramatic upswing in magazine circulation was the prominent coverage of corruption in politics, local government, and big business, particularly by journalists and writers who became known as muckrakers. They wrote for popular magazines to expose social and political sins and shortcomings. Relying on their own investigative journalism, muckrakers often worked to expose social ills and corporate and political corruption. Muckraking magazines, notably McClure's, took on corporate monopolies and political machines while raising public awareness of chronic urban poverty, unsafe working conditions, and social issues like child labor. Most of the muckrakers wrote nonfiction, but fictional exposés often had a major impact as well, such as those by Upton Sinclair. In his 1906 novel The Jungle, Sinclair exposed the unsanitary and unsafe working conditions of the meatpacking industry in graphic detail hoping to arouse working class solidarity. He quipped, "I aimed at the public's heart and by accident, I hit it in the stomach," as readers demanded and got the Meat Inspection Act and the Pure Food and Drug Act.

The journalists who specialized in exposing waste, corruption, and scandal operated at the state and local level, like Ray Stannard Baker, George Creel, and Brand Whitlock. Others such as Lincoln Steffens exposed political corruption in many large cities; Ida Tarbell is famed for her criticisms of John D. Rockefeller's Standard Oil Company. In 1906, David Graham Phillips unleashed a blistering indictment of corruption in the US Senate. Roosevelt gave these journalists their nickname when he complained they were not being helpful by raking up too much muck.

=== Modernization ===
The progressives were avid modernizers, with a belief in science and technology as the grand solution to society's flaws. They looked to education as the key to bridging the gap between their present wasteful society and technologically enlightened future society. Characteristics of progressivism included a favorable attitude toward urban–industrial society, belief in mankind's ability to improve the environment and conditions of life, belief in an obligation to intervene in economic and social affairs, a belief in the ability of experts and in the efficiency of government intervention. Scientific management, as promulgated by Frederick Winslow Taylor, became a watchword for industrial efficiency and elimination of waste, with the stopwatch as its symbol.

=== Philanthropy ===
The number of rich families climbed exponentially, from 100 or so millionaires in the 1870s to 4,000 in 1892 and 16,000 in 1916. Many subscribed to Andrew Carnegie's credo outlined in The Gospel of Wealth that said they owed a duty to society that called for philanthropic giving to colleges, hospitals, medical research, libraries, museums, religion, and social betterment.

In the early 20th century, American philanthropy matured, with the development of very large, highly visible private foundations created by Rockefeller and Carnegie. The largest foundations fostered modern, efficient, business-oriented operations (as opposed to "charity") designed to better society rather than merely enhance the status of the giver. Close ties were built with the local business community, as in the "community chest" movement. The American Red Cross was reorganized and professionalized. Several major foundations aided the blacks in the South and were typically advised by Booker T. Washington. By contrast, Europe and Asia had few foundations. This allowed both Carnegie and Rockefeller to operate internationally with a powerful effect.

=== Middle-class values ===
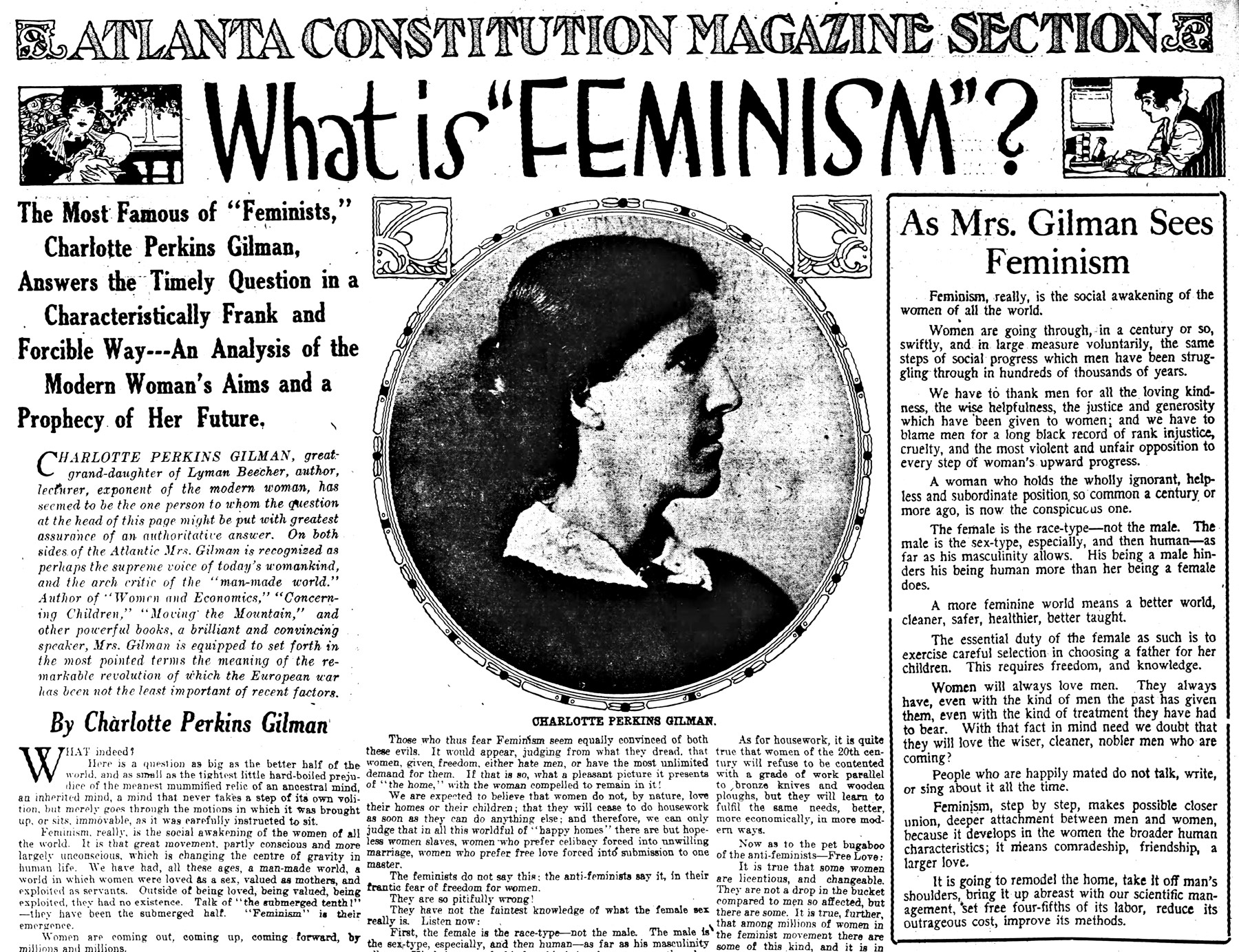
Charlotte Perkins Gilman (pictured) wrote these articles about feminism for the Atlanta Constitution, published on December 10, 1916.

A hallmark group of the Progressive Era, the middle class became the driving force behind much of the thought and reform that took place in this time. The middle class was characterized by their rejection of the individualistic philosophy of the Upper ten thousand. They had a rapidly growing interest in the communication and role between classes, those of which are generally referred to as the upper class, working class, farmers, and themselves. Along these lines, Jane Addams coined the term "association" as a counter to Individualism, with association referring to the search for a relationship between the classes. Additionally, the middle class (most notably women) began to move away from prior Victorian era domestic values. Divorce rates increased as women preferred to seek education and freedom from the home. If a divorce could not be afforded, a much more common option would have been to desert the wife and any potential children instead, forcing the wife into the workforce. Victorianism was thus pushed aside by the rise of progressivism.

=== Leaders and activists ===
==== Democrats ====
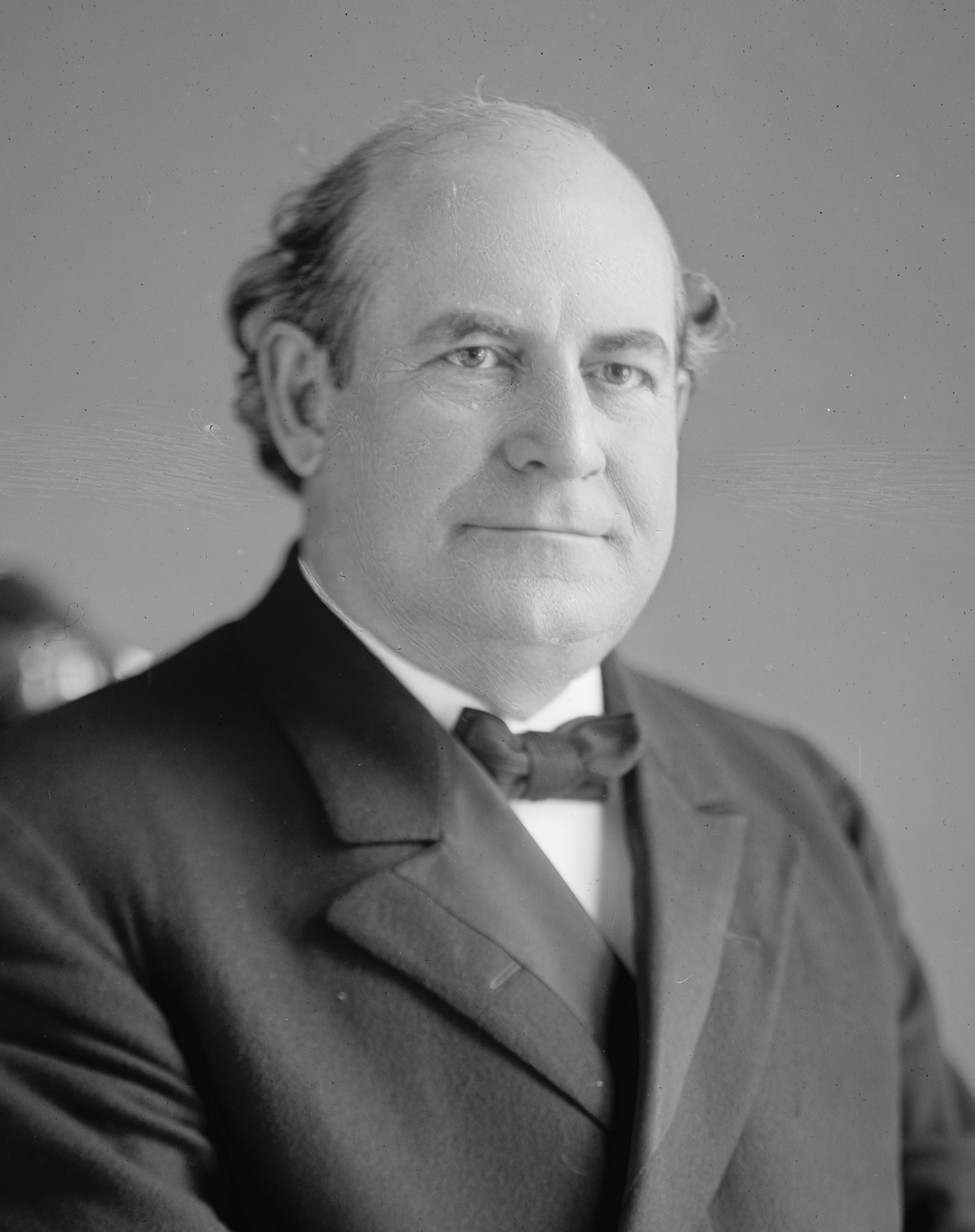
William Jennings Bryan

William Jennings Bryan of Nebraska dominated the Democratic Party. Apart from 1904, the anti-Bryan elements always got outmaneuvred. Bryan was its nominee for president in 1896, 1900, and 1908. In 1912 he selected Woodrow Wilson as the party candidate. Historian David Sarasohn evaluated the Democratic party in the Bryan era:

Democrats [were] an issue-oriented party (tariff and child labor reform, trust regulation, federal income tax, direct election of senators) and an emerging national coalition (southerners, western Progressives, blue-collar ethnic voters, and liberal intellectuals), most of whom shared a grudging but genuine admiration for their titular leader, William Jennings Bryan. Indeed, it is the Commoner [Bryan] whose spirit, vision, and yes, political sagacity, pervades the narrative.

===== President Woodrow Wilson =====
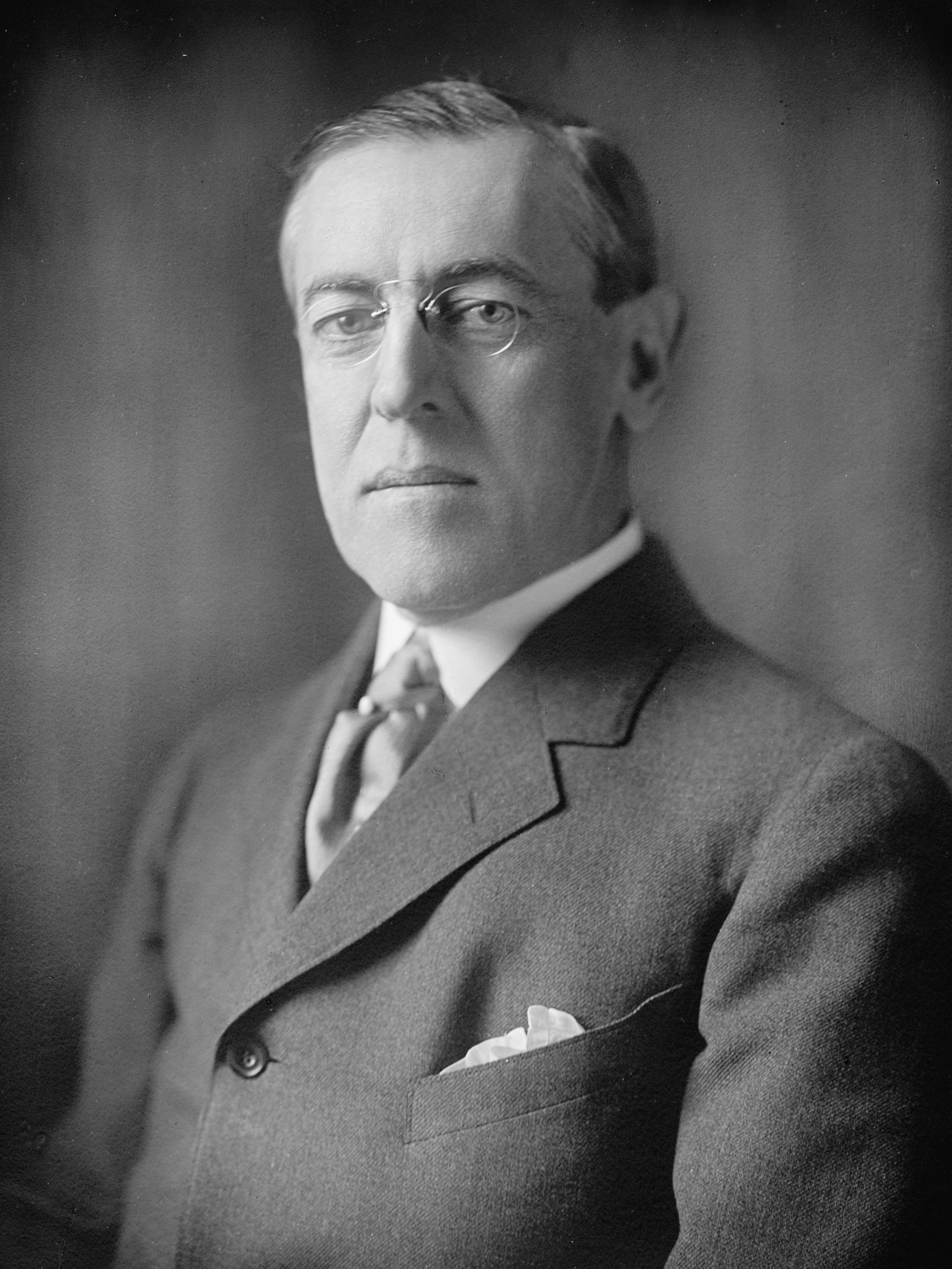
Woodrow Wilson

Woodrow Wilson gained a national reputation as governor of New Jersey in 1910-1912 by defeating the bosses and pushing through a progressive agenda. Before 1910 Wilson identified himself with the conservatism of Bourbon Democrats such as Grover Cleveland. Only when he accepted the nomination for governor did he identify himself with progressive causes. As president he introduced a comprehensive program of domestic legislation. He had four major domestic priorities: the conservation of natural resources, banking reform, tariff reduction, and opening access to raw materials by breaking up Western mining trusts. Though foreign affairs would unexpectedly dominate his presidency, Wilson's first two years in office largely focused on the implementation of his New Freedom domestic agenda. Wilson presided over the passage of his progressive New Freedom domestic agenda. His first major priority was the passage of the Revenue Act of 1913, which lowered tariffs and implemented a federal income tax. Later tax acts implemented a federal estate tax and raised the top income tax rate to 77 percent. Wilson also presided over the passage of the Federal Reserve Act, which created a central banking system in the form of the Federal Reserve System. Two major laws, the Federal Trade Commission Act and the Clayton Antitrust Act, were passed to regulate business and prevent monopolies. Wilson did not support civil rights and did not object to accelerating the segregation of federal employees. In World War I, he made internationalism a key element of the progressive outlook, as expressed in his Fourteen Points and the League of Nations—an ideal called Wilsonianism.

==== Republicans: La Follette of Wisconsin ====
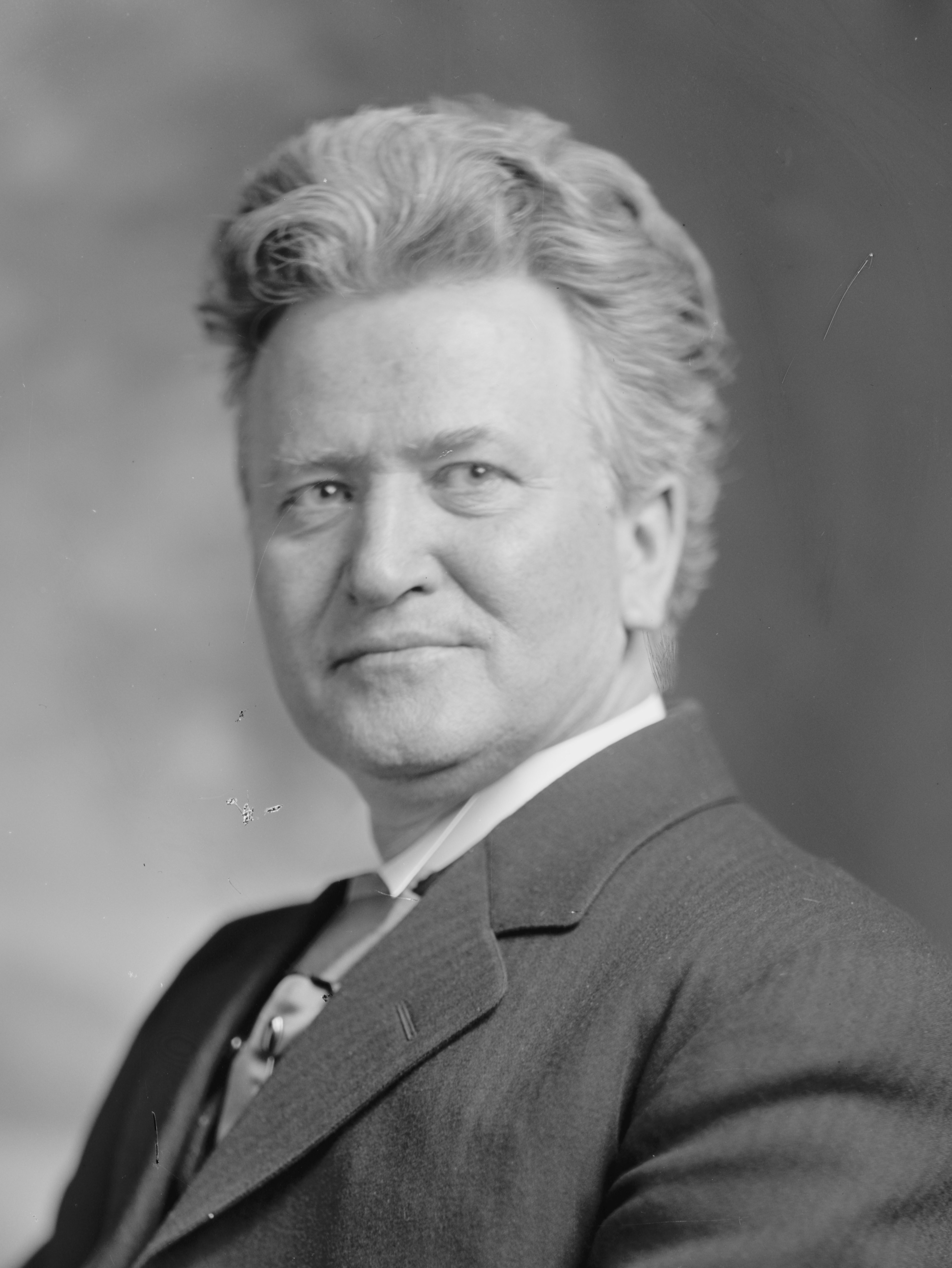
Robert M. La Follette

Robert M. La Follette and his family were the dominant forces of progressivism in Wisconsin from the late 1890s to the early 1940s. Starting as a loyal organizational Republican, he broke with the bosses in the late 1890s, built up a network of local organizers loyal to him, and fought for control of the state Republican Party, with mixed success. He failed to win the nomination for governor in 1896 and 1898 before winning the 1900 gubernatorial election. He aggressively took boss-like control of the Republican Party. La Follette won re-election in 1902 and 1904. He soon gained national attention for his progressive achievements, including primary elections, a ban on corporate lobbying, and tax reform. In 1905, his men in the legislature elected him to the United States Senate, where he emerged as a national progressive leader, often clashing with conservatives like Senator Nelson Aldrich. He initially supported President Taft, but broke with Taft after the latter failed to push a reduction in tariff rates. He challenged Taft for the Republican presidential nomination in the 1912 presidential election, but his candidacy was overshadowed by Theodore Roosevelt. Many progressives were alienated by La Follette's refusal to support Roosevelt, and by his lengthy speech before media leaders in February 1912, which was subsequently characterized as evidence of a nervous breakdown. La Follette forfeited his stature as a national leader of progressive Republicans, while remaining a power in Wisconsin. La Follette supported some of President Wilson's policies, but he broke with the president over foreign policy, thereby gaining support from Wisconsin's large German and Scandinavian elements. During World War I, La Follette was the most outspoken opponent of the administration's domestic and international policies.

With the major parties each nominating conservative candidates in the 1924 presidential election, left-wing groups coalesced behind La Follette's third-party candidacy. With the support of the Socialist Party, farmer's groups, labor unions, and others, La Follette was strong in Wisconsin, and to a much lesser extent in the West. He called for government ownership of railroads and electric utilities, cheap credit for farmers, stronger laws to help labor unions, and protections for civil liberties. La Follette won 17% of the popular vote and carried only his home state in the face of a Republican landslide. After his death in 1925 his sons, Robert M. La Follette Jr. and Philip La Follette, succeeded him as progressive leaders in Wisconsin.

==== President Theodore Roosevelt ====
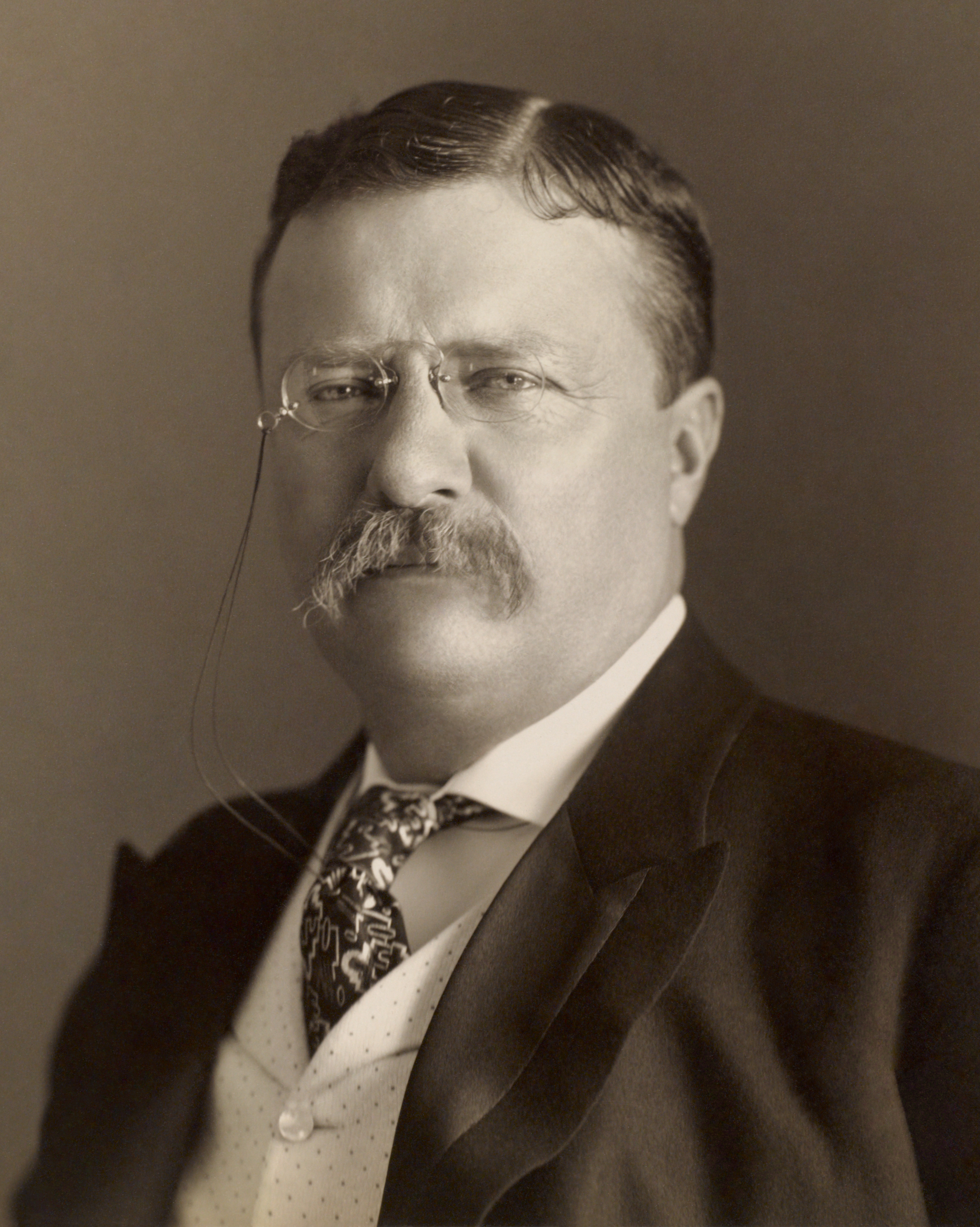
Theodore Roosevelt

President Theodore Roosevelt was a leader of the Progressive movement, and he championed his "Square Deal" domestic policies, promising the average citizen fairness, breaking of trusts, regulation of railroads, and pure food and drugs. He made conservation a top priority and established many new national parks, forests, and monuments intended to preserve the nation's natural resources. In foreign policy, he focused on Central America where he began construction of the Panama Canal. He expanded the army and sent the Great White Fleet on a world tour to project the United States naval power around the globe. His successful efforts to broker the end of the Russo-Japanese War won him the 1906 Nobel Peace Prize. He avoided controversial tariff and money issues.

He was elected to a full term in 1904 and continued to promote progressive policies, some of which were passed in Congress. By 1906, he continued to promote progressive policies, advocating for some social welfare programs, and criticizing various business practices such as trusts. The leadership of the GOP in Congress moved to the right, as did his protégé President William Howard Taft. Roosevelt broke bitterly with Taft in 1910, and also with Wisconsin's progressive leader Robert M. La Follette. Taft defeated Roosevelt for the 1912 Republican nomination and Roosevelt set up an entirely new Progressive Party. It called for a "New Nationalism" with active supervision of corporations, higher taxes, and unemployment and old-age insurance. He supported voting rights for women but was silent on certain civil rights for blacks, notably when it came to disenfranchisement in southern states. He spoke out against lynching, but he did not take concrete action against it.

Compared to Taft and Wilson, Roosevelt was more positive on civil rights. Taft cowered to pressure. Wilson was outright racist. He segregated the federal government at every level he could. His parents had been supporters of slavery and the Confederacy. He screened the racist "Birth of a Nation" despite protests and boycotts by many Americans. He regarded segregation as a "benefit".

Roosevelt was the first President to invite an African-American to dinner at the White House (Booker T. Washington, a well-known businessman who was the first leader of the Tuskegee Institute). As Governor of New York he had invited African-Americans to dinner. After this dinner, in 1901, some Southerners and some media made a big deal out of it. Roosevelt was appalled by the anger shown. He continued to meet with Washington.

He wrote,"The only wise and honorable and Christian thing to do is to treat each Black man and each white man strictly on his merits as a man, giving him no more and no less than he shows himself worthy to have."

Roosevelt also appointed several African-Americans to positions, for example William Crum in Charleston, South Carolina as customs collector. He did not back down when there were complaints. After opposition of Crum's position, this was his response: "I cannot consent to take the position that the door of hope—the door of opportunity—is to be shut upon any man, no matter how worthy, purely upon the grounds of race or color." Roosevelt defended the first African-American female post master, Minnie Cox, after she was forced out of Indianola, Mississippi due to racism. But he also held racist views, writing in 1906 to a friend that black people were inferior. In 1916 he told a friend that black people in the South were unfit to vote. He believed, contrary to evidence, that black men made bad soldiers. Roosevelt also spoke badly of indigenous Americans, believing them to be inferior and wild. He believed in removing Natives from their ancestral territories. He also believed in eugenics. When there was evidence planted in Brownsville, Texas against a group of black soldiers, though they had alibis, he didn't stop them from being dishonorably discharged. He faced much criticism for this.

Roosevelt lost and his new party collapsed, as conservatism dominated the GOP for decades to come. Biographer William Harbaugh argues:

In foreign affairs, Theodore Roosevelt's legacy is judicious support of the national interest and promotion of world stability through the maintenance of a balance of power; creation or strengthening of international agencies, and resort to their use when practicable; and implicit resolve to use military force, if feasible, to foster legitimate American interests. In domestic affairs, it is the use of government to advance the public interest. "If on this new continent", he said, "we merely build another country of great but unjustly divided material prosperity, we shall have done nothing".

==== Charles Evans Hughes ====
In New York Republican Governor Charles Evans Hughes (1907 to 1910) was known for exposing the insurance industry. During his time in office he promoted a range of reforms. He was on the Supreme Court and out of politics in 1912 when the GOP ruptured. That made him acceptable to both the Taft and the Roosevelt wings of the party as the presidential candidate in 1916, but he lost very narrowly to Wilson. As Associate Justice of the Supreme Court, he often sided with Oliver Wendell Holmes in upholding popular reforms such as the minimum wage, workmen's compensation, and maximum work hours for women and children. He also wrote several opinions upholding the power of Congress to regulate interstate commerce under the Commerce Clause. His majority opinion in the Baltimore and Ohio Railroad v. Interstate Commerce Commission upheld the right of the federal government to regulate the hours of railroad workers. His majority opinion in the 1914 Shreveport Rate Case upheld a decision by the Interstate Commerce Commission to void discriminatory railroad rates imposed by the Railroad Commission of Texas. The decision established that the federal government could regulate intrastate commerce when it affected interstate commerce, though Hughes avoided directly overruling the 1895 case of United States v. E. C. Knight Co. As Chief Justice of the Supreme Court (1930 to 1941) he took a moderate middle position and upheld key New Deal laws.

==== Activists and Muckrakers ====
Gifford Pinchot was an American forester and political activist who served as the first Chief of the United States Forest Service from 1905 until 1910 and was the 28th Governor of Pennsylvania, serving from 1923 to 1927, and again from 1931 to 1935. He was a member of the Republican Party for most of his life, though he also joined the Progressive Party for a brief period. Pinchot is known for reforming the management and development of forests in the United States and for advocating the conservation of the nation's reserves by planned use and renewal. Pinchot coined the term conservation ethic as applied to natural resources. Pinchot's main contribution was his leadership in promoting scientific forestry and emphasizing the controlled, profitable use of forests and other natural resources so they would be of maximum benefit to mankind. He was the first to demonstrate the practicality and profitability of managing forests for continuous cropping. His leadership put the conservation of forests high on America's priority list.

Herbert Croly was an intellectual leader of the movement as an editor, political philosopher and a co-founder of the magazine The New Republic. His political philosophy influenced many leading progressives including Theodore Roosevelt, Adolph Berle, as well as his close friends Judge Learned Hand and Supreme Court Justice Felix Frankfurter. Croly's 1909 book The Promise of American Life looked to the constitutional liberalism as espoused by Alexander Hamilton, combined with the radical democracy of Thomas Jefferson. The book influenced contemporaneous progressive thought, shaping the ideas of many intellectuals and political leaders, including then ex-President Theodore Roosevelt. Calling themselves "The New Nationalists", Croly and Walter Weyl sought to remedy the relatively weak national institutions with a strong federal government. He promoted a strong army and navy and attacked pacifists who thought democracy at home and peace abroad was best served by keeping America weak.

Croly was one of the founders of modern liberalism in the United States, especially through his books, essays and a highly influential magazine founded in 1914, The New Republic. In his 1914 book Progressive Democracy, Croly rejected the thesis that the liberal tradition in the United States was inhospitable to anti-capitalist alternatives. He drew from the American past a history of resistance to capitalist wage relations that was fundamentally liberal, and he reclaimed an idea that progressives had allowed to lapse—that working for wages was a lesser form of liberty. Increasingly skeptical of the capacity of social welfare legislation to remedy social ills, Croly argued that America's liberal promise could be redeemed only by syndicalist reforms involving workplace democracy. His liberal goals were part of his commitment to American republicanism.

Upton Sinclair was an American writer. Sinclair's work was well known and popular in the first half of the 20th century, and he won the Pulitzer Prize for Fiction in 1943. In 1906, Sinclair acquired particular fame for his classic muck-raking novel The Jungle, which exposed labor and sanitary conditions in the U.S. meatpacking industry, causing a public uproar that contributed in part to the passage a few months later of the 1906 Pure Food and Drug Act and the Meat Inspection Act. In 1919, he published The Brass Check, a muck-raking exposé of American journalism that publicized the issue of yellow journalism and the limitations of the "free press" in the United States. Four years after publication of The Brass Check, the first code of ethics for journalists was created.

Ida Tarbell, a writer and lecturer, was one of the leading muckrakers and pioneered investigative journalism. Tarbell is best known for her 1904 book, The History of the Standard Oil Company. The work helped turn elite public opinion against the Standard Oil monopoly.

Lincoln Steffens was another investigative journalist and one of the leading muckrakers. He launched a series of articles in McClure's, called Tweed Days in St. Louis, that would later be published together in a book titled The Shame of the Cities. He is remembered for investigating corruption in municipal government in American cities and leftist values.

== Federal activity ==
On a federal level, progressives in Congress also influenced a number of progressive reforms, with various reform measures introduced that affected areas such as agriculture, public health and working conditions. As reflected by William Allen White:

In the election of 1910 Kansas went overwhelmingly progressive Republican. The conservative faction was decisively divided. The same thing happened generally over the country north of the Mason and Dixon line. The progressive Republicans did not have a majority in either house of Congress. But they had a balance of power; amalgamation with a similar but smaller group of progressive Democrats under Bryan's leadership gave the progressives a working majority upon most measures. They had seen the conservative Democrats and the conservative Republicans united openly, proudly, victoriously to save Speaker Cannon from the ultimate humiliation when his power was taken from him by his progressive partisans. So in the legislatures and the Congress that met in 1911 a strange new thing was revealed in American politics. Party lines were breaking down. A bipartisan party was appearing in legislatures and in the Congress. It was an undeclared third party. But when the new party appeared on the left, the conservative Democrats and the conservative Republicans generally coalesced in legislative bodies on the right. For the most part the right wing coalescents were in the minority. In Congress, on most measures, the leftwing liberals were able to command a majority. They united upon a railroad regulation bill. They united in promoting the income tax constitutional amendment. They united in submitting another amendment providing for the direct election of United States Senators, which was indeed revolutionary. But they were unable to unite in the passage of a tariff bill. Local interests in regional commodity industries like cotton, lumber, copper, wool, and textiles were able to form a conservative alliance which, under the leadership of President Taft in the White House, put through a tariff bill that was an offense to the nation. But otherwise the new party of reform which had grown up in ten years dominated politics in Washington and in the state legislatures north of the Ohio from New England to California.

== State and local activity ==
According to James Wright, the typical progressive agenda at the state level included:

A reduction of corporate influence, open processes of government and politics, equity entrance in taxation, efficiency in government mental operation, and an expanded, albeit limited, state responsibility to the citizens who are most vulnerable and deprived.

In the South, prohibition was high on the agenda but controversial. Jim Crow and disenfranchisement of Black voters was even higher on the agenda. In the Western states, woman suffrage was a success story, but racist anti-Asian sentiment also prevailed. In the East, every state had a progressive movement, but the conservative forces were usually more powerful. As an organized grassroots insurgency force the progressive movement was weak in New England. For example, "Massachusetts never caught the spirit of change which dominated the era, and consequently it appeared, at best, merely conservative." When Theodore Roosevelt became governor of New York in 1898, his progressivism annoyed party leaders. They ended his reelection plans in 1900 by getting him placed on the national ticket as McKinley's running mate for vice president. Belatedly progressivism emerged around 1905 under Governor Charles Evans Hughes.

=== Western states ===
==== Oregon ====
The Oregon Direct Legislation League was an organization of political activists founded by William S. U'Ren in 1898. Oregon was one of the few states where former Populists like U'Ren became progressive leaders. U'Ren had been inspired by reading the influential 1893 book Direct Legislation Through the Initiative and Referendum, and the group's founding followed in the wake of the 1896 founding of the National Direct Legislation League, which itself had its roots in the Direct Legislation League of New Jersey and its short-lived predecessor, the People's Power League.

The group led efforts in Oregon to establish an initiative and referendum system, allowing direct legislation by the state's citizens. In 1902, the Oregon Legislative Assembly approved such a system, which was known at the time as the "Oregon System".

The group's further efforts led to successful ballot initiatives implementing a direct primary system in 1904, and allowing citizens to directly recall public officials in 1908.

Democrats who promoted progressive policies included George Earle Chamberlain (governor 1903–1909 and senator 1909–1921); Oswald West (governor 1911–1915); and Harry Lane (senator 1913–1917). The most important Republican was Jonathan Bourne Jr. (senator 1907–1913 and national leader of progressive causes 1911–1912).

==== California ====
California built the most successful grass roots progressive movement in the country by mobilizing independent organizations and largely ignoring the conservative state parties. The system continues strong into the 21st century. Following the Oregon model, John Randolph Haynes organized the Direct Legislation League of California in 1902 to launch the campaign for inclusion of the initiative and referendum in the state's constitution. The League sent questionnaires to prospective candidates to the state legislature to obtain their stance on direct legislation and to make those positions public. It then flooded the state with letters seeking new members, money, and endorsements from organizations like the State Federation of Labor. As membership grew it worked with other private organizations to petition the state legislature, which was not responsive. In 1902 the League won a state constitutional amendment establishing direct democracy at the local level, and in 1904, it successfully engineered the recall of the first public official.

=== South ===
Progressivism was strongest in the cities, but the South was rural with few large cities. Nevertheless, statewide progressive movements were organized by Democrats in every Southern state. Furthermore, Southern Democrats in Congress gave strong support to President Wilson's reforms.

After 1896 the Democrats controlled all the Southern states and third party efforts had collapsed. Blacks still favored the Republicans but they were rigidly segregated by Jim Crow laws and were rarely allowed to vote. Some Appalachian mountain areas had local Republican majorities. In the urban South, an emerging professional and business middle class led the progressive movement.

The vast majority of southerners lived in rural areas where Democrats were polarized. The wealthy plantation owners in the prosperous districts were called Bourbon Democrats because of their conservatism. They used blacks to work their plantations. They tried to politically dominate the poor white farmers in the rest of the state. The latter were ridiculed as "rednecks" and "hillbillies", and their leaders denounced as "demagogues." Both sides supported white supremacy, but the main impulse for progressivism came from the poor whites. According to historian Albert Kirwan, in Mississippi it was not until the demagogues James K. Vardaman and Theodore G. Bilbo,

Awakened the social consciousness of the people that any constructive social legislation was enacted. . . . [As governor] Bilbo carried it further with his commission to eliminate adult illiteracy, a law to curb the textbook trust, the furnishing of transportation for children in the rural consolidated schools, and the passage of a compulsory school attendance law. Under his administration, too, laws were passed curbing the activities of corporations and the sale of bogus stocks., regulating public utilities, and breaking the insurance trust. He sponsored the building of hospitals and institutions for the subnormal, game and fish laws, temperance, laws to eradicate ticks and tuberculosis from cattle, estate and inheritance taxes, a tax equalization commission, antilobbying laws, and the elimination of public hangings.

Jim Hogg, who served as governor of Texas from 1891 to 1895, presided over a series of progressive reform measures during his tenure. According to Democrat Edward M House, Texas was "the pioneer of successful progressive legislation," citing Hogg's tenure as the catalyst.

==== African American role ====
African Americans developed their own version of the Progressive Movement, with two different approaches led by Booker T. Washington and his supporters in the Black business community, versus W. E. B. Du Bois and the NAACP based in Northern cities .

The South was a main target of Northern philanthropy designed to fight poverty and disease, and help the black community. Booker T. Washington used the National Negro Business League to mobilize small black-owned business and secured access to Northern philanthropy. Across the South the General Education Board (funded by the Rockefeller family) provided large-scale subsidies for black schools, which otherwise continued to be underfunded. The South was targeted in the 1920s and 1930s by the Julius Rosenwald Fund, which contributed matching funds to local communities for the construction of thousands of schools for African Americans in rural areas throughout the South. Black parents donated land and labor to build improved schools for their children.

==== North Carolina ====
North Carolina took a leadership role in modernizing the south, notably in expansion of public education and the state university system and improvements in transportation, which earned it the nickname "The Good Roads State". State leaders included Governor Charles B. Aycock, who led both the educational and the white supremacy crusades; diplomat Walter Hines Page; and educator Charles Duncan McIver. Women were especially active through the WCTU, the Baptist church, overseas missions, local public schools, and in the cause of prohibition, leading North Carolina to become the first southern state to implement statewide prohibition. Progressives worked to limit child labor in textile mills and supported public health campaigns to eradicate hookworm and other debilitating diseases. While the majority of North Carolininans continued to support traditional gender roles, and state legislators did not ratify the Nineteenth Amendment until 1971, Progressive reformers like Gertrude Weil and Elizabeth Delia Dixon Carroll lobbied for woman suffrage.

Following the Wilmington massacre, North Carolina imposed strict legal segregation and used poll taxes and literacy tests in order to disfranchise Black men. In the Black community, Charlotte Hawkins Brown built the Palmer Memorial Institute to provide a liberal arts education to Black children and promote excellence and leadership. Brown worked with Booker T. Washington (in his role with the National Negro Business League), who provided ideas and access to Northern philanthropy.

=== Midwest ===
Apart from Wisconsin, the Midwestern states were about average in supporting Progressive reforms. Ohio took the lead in municipal reform.

The negative effects of industrialization triggered the political movement of progressivism, which aimed to address its negative consequences through social reform and government regulation. Jane Addams and Ellen Gates Starr pioneered the settlement house outreach to newly arrived immigrants by establishing Hull House in Chicago in 1889. Settlement houses provided social services and played an active role in civic life, helping immigrants prepare for naturalization and campaigning for regulation and services from city government. Midwestern mayors—especially Hazen S. Pingree and Tom L. Johnson, led early reforms against boss-dominated municipal politics, while Samuel M. Jones advocated public ownership of local utilities. Robert M. La Follette, the most famous leader of Midwestern progressivism, began his career by winning election against his state's Republican party in 1900. The machine was temporarily defeated, allowing reformers to launch the "Wisconsin idea" of expanded democracy. This idea included major reforms such as direct primaries, campaign finance, civil service, anti-lobbying laws, state income and inheritance taxes, child labor restrictions, pure food, and workmen's compensation laws. La Follette promoted government regulation of railroads, public utilities, factories, and banks. Although La Follette lost influence in the national party in 1912, the Wisconsin reforms became a model for national progressivism.

==== Wisconsin ====
Wisconsin from 1900 to the late 1930s was a regional and national model for innovation and organization in the progressive movement. The direct primary made it possible to mobilize voters against the previously dominant political machines. The first factors involved the La Follette family going back and forth between trying to control of the Republican Party and if frustrated trying third-party activity especially in 1924 and the 1930s. Secondly the Wisconsin idea, of intellectuals and planners based at the University of Wisconsin shaping government policy. LaFollette started as a traditional Republican in the 1890s, where he fought against populism and other radical movements. He broke decisively with the state Republican leadership, and took control of the party by 1900, all the time quarreling endlessly with ex-allies.

The Democrats were a minor conservative factor in Wisconsin. The Socialists, with a strong German and union base in Milwaukee, joined the progressives in statewide politics. Senator Robert M. La Follette tried to use his national reputation to challenge President Taft for the Republican nomination in 1912. However, as soon as Roosevelt declared his candidacy, most of La Follette's supporters switched away. La Follette supported many of his Wilson's domestic programs in Congress. However he strongly opposed Wilson's foreign policy, and mobilized the large German and Scandinavian elements which demanded neutrality in the World War I. He finally ran an independent campaign for president in 1924 that appealed to the German Americans, labor unions, socialists, and more radical reformers. He won 1/6 of the national vote, but carried only his home state. After his death in 1925 his two sons took over the party. They serve terms as governor and senator and set up a third party in the state. The third party fell apart in the 1930s, and totally collapsed by 1946.

The Wisconsin Idea was the commitment of the University of Wisconsin under President Charles R. Van Hise, with LaFollette support, to use the university's powerful intellectual resources to develop practical progressive reforms for the state and indeed for the nation.

Between 1901 and 1911, Progressive Republicans in Wisconsin created the nation's first comprehensive statewide primary election system, the first effective workplace injury compensation law, and the first state income tax, making taxation proportional to actual earnings. The key leaders were Robert M. La Follette and (in 1910) Governor Francis E. McGovern. However, in 1912 McGovern supported Roosevelt for president and LaFollette was outraged. He made sure the next legislature defeated the governor's programs, and that McGovern was defeated in his bid for the Senate in 1914. The Progressive movement split into hostile factions. Some was based on personalities—especially La Follette's style of violent personal attacks against other Progressives, and some was based on who should pay, with the division between farmers (who paid property taxes) and the urban element (which paid income taxes). This disarray enabled the conservatives (called "Stalwarts") to elect Emanuel Philipp as governor in 1914. The Stalwart counterattack said the Progressives were too haughty, too beholden to experts, too eager to regulate, and too expensive. Economy and budget cutting was their formula.

The progressive Wisconsin Idea promoted the use of the University of Wisconsin faculty as intellectual resources for state government, and as guides for local government. It promoted expansion of the university through the UW-Extension system to reach all the state's farming communities. University economics professors John R. Commons and Harold Groves enabled Wisconsin to create the first unemployment compensation program in the United States in 1932. Other Wisconsin Idea scholars at the university generated the plan that became the New Deal's Social Security Act of 1935, with Wisconsin expert Arthur J. Altmeyer playing the key role. The Stalwarts counterattacked by arguing if the university became embedded in the state, then its internal affairs became fair game, especially the faculty preference for advanced research over undergraduate teaching. The Stalwarts controlled the Regents, and their interference in academic freedom outraged the faculty. Historian Frederick Jackson Turner, the most famous professor, quit and went to Harvard.

==== Illinois ====
Chicago was a hotbed for reform, led by the Hull House circle. Philosopher John Dewey and Ella Flagg Young at the University of Chicago's Laboratory School influenced educational philosophy and practice nationwide. The collaboration between Dewey and Hull House residents shaped progressive education reforms that were adopted in other parts of the country.

Florence Kelley worked at Hull House from 1891 to 1899 and was appointed Illinois's first chief factory inspector in 1893. She used this position to expose abusive working conditions, especially for children, and successfully lobbied for the creation of the federal Bureau of Labor Statistics.

Ida B. Wells moved to Chicago in 1895 and became a leading civil rights journalist and anti-lynching activist. She founded the Illinois Negro Women's Club and the Alpha Suffrage Club of Chicago, worked as a probation officer, and helped establish the National Association for the Advancement of Colored People (NAACP) in 1910.

===== Jane Addams =====
Jane Addams was an American settlement activist, reformer, social worker, sociologist, public administrator, and author. She was a notable figure in the history of social work and women's suffrage in the United States and an advocate of world peace. She co-founded Chicago's Hull House, one of America's most famous settlement houses. In 1920, she was a co-founder for the American Civil Liberties Union (ACLU). In 1931, she became the first American woman to be awarded the Nobel Peace Prize, and is recognized as the founder of the social work profession in the United States. Maurice Hamington considered her a radical pragmatist and the first woman "public philosopher" in the United States. In the 1930s, she was the best-known female public figure in the United States.

==== Kansas ====
State leaders in reform included editor William Allen White, who reached a national audience, and Governor Walter R. Stubbs. According to Gene Clanton's study of Kansas, populism and progressivism have a few similarities but different bases of support. Both opposed corruption and trusts. Populism emerged earlier and came out of the farm community. It was radically egalitarian in favor of the disadvantaged classes. It was weak in the towns and cities except in labor unions. Progressivism, on the other hand, was a later movement. It emerged after the 1890s from the urban business and professional communities. Most of its activists had opposed populism. It was elitist, and emphasized education and expertise. Its goals were to enhance efficiency, reduce waste, and enlarge the opportunities for upward social mobility. However, some former Populists changed their emphasis after 1900 and supported progressive reforms.

==== Ohio ====
Ohio was distinctive for municipal reform in the major cities, especially Toledo, Cleveland, Columbus, and Dayton. The middle class lived in leafy neighborhoods in the city and took the trolley to work in downtown offices. The working class saved money by walking to their factory jobs; municipal reformers appealed to the middle-class vote, by attacking the high fares and mediocre service of privately owned transit companies. They often proposed city ownership of the transit lines, but the homeowners were reluctant to save a penny on fares by paying more dollars in property taxes.

Dayton, Ohio, was under the reform leadership of John Patterson, the hard-charging chief executive of National Cash Register company. He appealed to the businessman with the gospel of efficiency in municipal affairs, run by non-partisan experts like himself. He wanted a city manager form of government in which outside experts would bring efficiency while elected officials would have little direct power, and bribery would not prevail. When the city council balked at his proposals, he threatened to move the National Cash Register factories to another city, and they fell in line. A massive flood in Dayton in 1913 killed 400 people and caused $100 million in property damage. Patterson took charge of the relief work and demonstrated in person the sort of business leaders he proposed. Dayton adopted his policies; by 1920, 177 American cities had followed suit and adopted city manager governments.

==== Iowa ====
Iowa had a mixed record. The spirit of progressivism emerged in the 1890s, peaked in the 1900s, and decayed after 1917. Under the guidance of Governor (1902–1908) and Senator (1908–1926) Albert Baird Cummins the "Iowa Idea" played a role in state and national reform. A leading Republican, Cummins fought to break up monopolies. His Iowa successes included establishing the direct primary to allow voters to select candidates instead of bosses; outlawing free railroad passes for politicians; imposing a two-cents-per-mile railway maximum passenger fare; imposing pure food and drug laws; and abolishing corporate campaign contributions. He tried, without success, to lower the high protective tariff in Washington.

Women put women's suffrage on the state agenda. It was led by local chapters of the Woman's Christian Temperance Union, whose main goal was to impose prohibition. In keeping with the general reform mood of the latter 1860s and 1870s, the issue first received serious consideration when both houses of the General Assembly passed a women's suffrage amendment to the state constitution in 1870. Two years later, however, when the legislature had to consider the amendment again before it could be submitted to the general electorate. It was defeated because interest had waned, and strong opposition had developed especially in the German-American community, which feared women would impose prohibition. Finally, in 1920, Iowa got woman suffrage with the rest of the country by the 19th amendment to the federal Constitution.

== Key ideas and issues ==
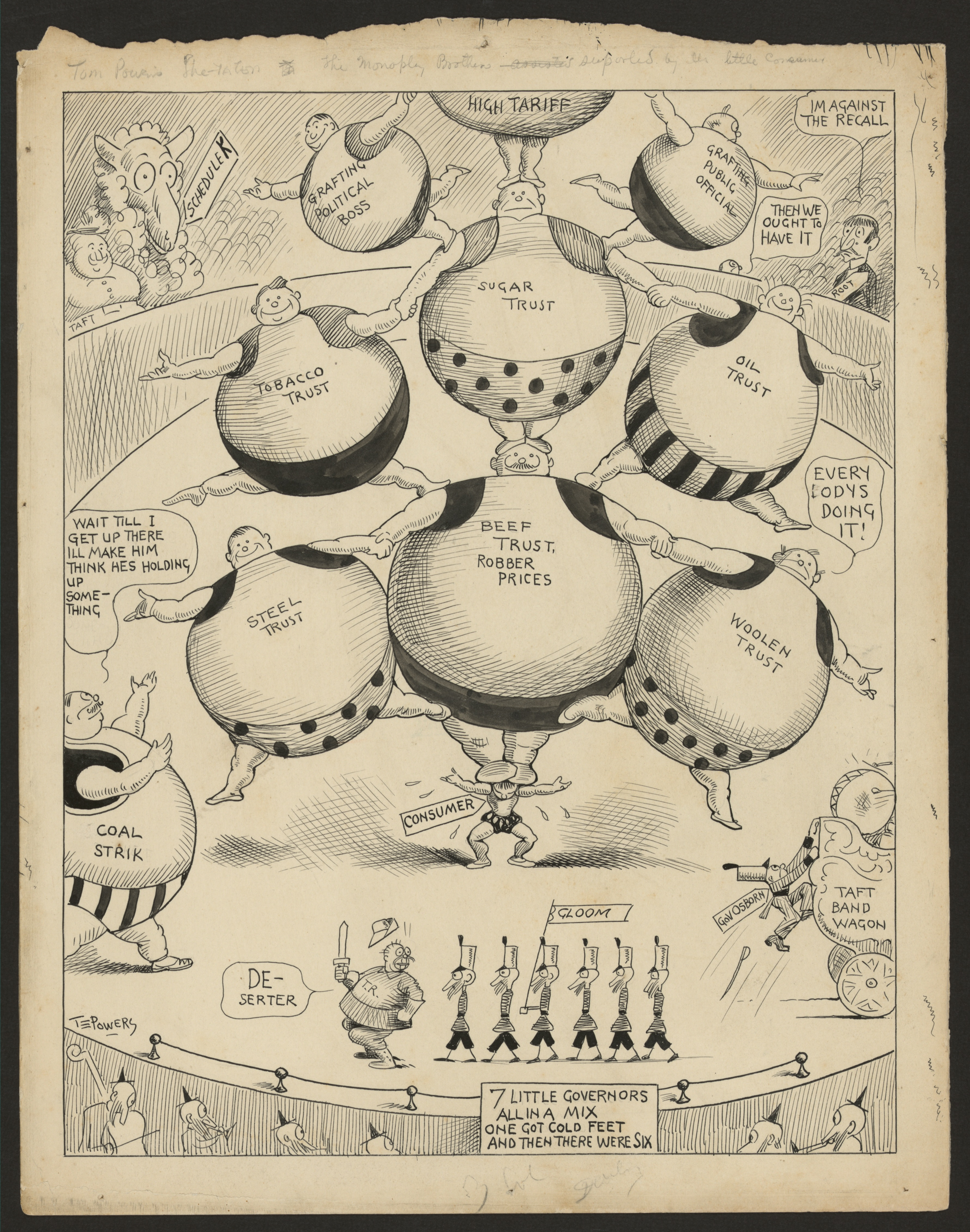
Monopoly brothers—Politically powerful trusts created high prices all carried by hapless little consumer 1912; by Thomas Powers

According to historian Nancy Cohen:

During the Progressive Era . . . the minimal state of an earlier liberalism was abandoned in favor of one with the power to intervene in the market and to promote social welfare. The progressives' new liberalism, most historians conclude, was fundamentally reformist; it sought to use state power to regulate the capitalist economy and to improve the living conditions and "security" of the citizenry, without abolishing private property or revolutionizing liberal democratic political institutions.

=== Antitrust ===
Standard Oil, with its near monopoly on refining oil, was widely hated. Many newspapers reprinted attacks from a flagship Democratic newspaper, The New York World, which made this trust a special target. There were legal efforts to curtail the oil monopoly in the Midwest and South. Tennessee, Illinois, Kentucky and Kansas took the lead in 1904–1905, followed by Arkansas, Iowa, Maryland, Minnesota, Mississippi, Nebraska, Ohio, Oklahoma, Texas, and West Virginia. The results were mixed. Federal action finally won out in 1911, splitting Standard Oil into 33 companies. The 33 seldom competed with each other. The federal decision together with the Clayton Antitrust Act of 1914 and the creation that year of the Federal Trade Commission largely de-escalated the antitrust rhetoric among progressives. The new framework after 1914 had little or no impact on the direction and magnitude of merger activity.

=== Primaries ===
By 1890, the secret ballot was widely adopted by the states for elections, which was non-controversial and resulted in the elimination of purchased votes since the purchaser couldn't determine how the voter cast their vote. Despite this change, the candidates were still selected by party conventions. In the 1890s, the South witnessed a decrease in the possibility of Republican or Populist or coalition victories in most elections, with the Democratic Party gaining full control over all statewide Southern elections. To prevent factionalism within the Democratic Party, Southern states began implementing primaries. However, candidates who competed in the primaries and lost were prohibited from running as independents in the fall election. Louisiana was the first state to introduce primaries in 1892, and by 1907, eleven Southern and border states had implemented statewide primaries.

In the North, Robert La Follette introduced the primary in Wisconsin in 1904. Most Northern states followed suit, with reformers proclaiming grass roots democracy. The party leaders and bosses also wanted direct primaries to minimize the risk of sore losers running as independents.

When candidates for office were selected by the party caucus (meetings open to the public) or by statewide party conventions of elected delegates, the public lost a major opportunity to shape policy. The progressive solution was the "open" primary by which any citizen could vote, or the "closed" primary limited to party members. In the early 20th century most states adopted the system for local and state races—but only 14 used it for delegates to the national presidential nominating conventions. The biggest battles came in New York state, where the conservatives fought hard for years against several governors until the primary was finally adopted in 1913.

=== Government reform ===
Significant changes enacted at the national levels included the imposition of an income tax with the Sixteenth Amendment, direct election of Senators with the Seventeenth Amendment, prohibition of alcohol with the Eighteenth Amendment, election reforms to stop corruption and fraud, and women's suffrage through the Nineteenth Amendment to the U.S. Constitution.

A main objective of the Progressive Era movement was to eliminate corruption within the government. The most important political leaders during this time were Theodore Roosevelt and Robert M. La Follette. Key Democratic leaders were William Jennings Bryan, Woodrow Wilson, and Al Smith.

This movement targeted the regulations of huge monopolies and corporations. This was done through antitrust laws to promote equal competition among every business. This was done through the Sherman Act of 1890, the Clayton Act of 1914, and the Federal Trade Commission Act of 1914.

==== City manager ====
At the local level the new city manager system was designed by progressives to increase efficiency and reduce partisanship and avoid the bribery of elected local officials. Kansas was a leader, where it was promoted in the press, led by Henry J. Allen of the Wichita Beacon, and pushed through by Governor Arthur Capper. Eventually 52 Kansas cities used the system.

=== Family roles ===
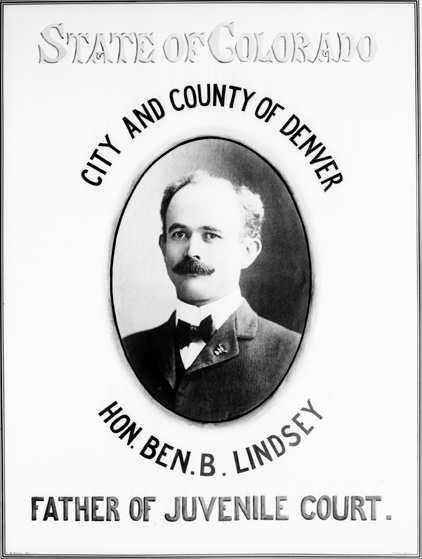
Colorado judge Ben Lindsey, a pioneer in the establishment of juvenile court systems

By the late 19th century, urban and rural governments had systems in place for welfare to the poor and incapacitated. Progressives argued these needs deserved a higher priority. Local public assistance programs were reformed to try to keep families together. Inspired by crusading Judge Ben Lindsey of Denver, cities established juvenile courts to deal with disruptive teenagers without sending them to adult prisons.

=== Pure food, drugs, and water ===
The purity of food, milk, and drinking water became a high priority in the cities. At the state and national levels new food and drug laws strengthened urban efforts to guarantee the safety of the food system. The 1906 federal Pure Food and Drug Act, which was pushed by drug companies and providers of medical services, removed from the market patent medicines that had never been scientifically tested.

With the decrease in standard working hours, urban families had more leisure time. Many spent this leisure time at movie theaters. Progressives advocated censorship of motion pictures as it was believed that patrons (especially children) viewing movies in dark, unclean, potentially unsafe theaters, might be negatively influenced in witnessing actors portraying crimes, violence, and sexually suggestive situations. Progressives across the country influenced municipal governments of large urban cities, to build numerous parks where it was believed that leisure time for children and families could be spent in a healthy, wholesome environment, thereby fostering good morals and citizenship.

=== Public health ===
==== Social hygiene movement ====
The social hygiene movement brought together different groups that were concerned with venereal disease, prostitution, society's moral standards, and family life. The primary objective was to enhance public health and promote social morality, specifically in matters concerning sexuality and reproductive health. The movement targeted prostitution or "white slavery" and aimed to eliminate it by criminalizing it and enforcing stricter penalties for those involved in the sex trade. When the US entered the war a high priority was to end prostitution in proximity to military installations. The result was a permanent closing of red light districts in major cities.

Besides public health, the social hygiene movement also aimed to uphold moral purity and family values. The Women's Christian Temperance Union (WCTU) and the Young Men's Christian Association (YMCA) were among the leading groups that encouraged abstinence and discouraged premarital sex. They also advocated for more stringent censorship of literature and entertainment deemed morally unacceptable. While the social hygiene movement achieved considerable success in promoting public health and morality, its approach of criminalizing prostitution and promoting abstinence failed to address the underlying causes of these issues, such as poverty, economic inequality, and gender inequality. Moreover, its strict moral standards often marginalized groups such as immigrants and African Americans. Nonetheless, the movement genuinely sought to promote public health and social morality and to create a more stable and ordered society.

== Social welfare to fight poverty ==
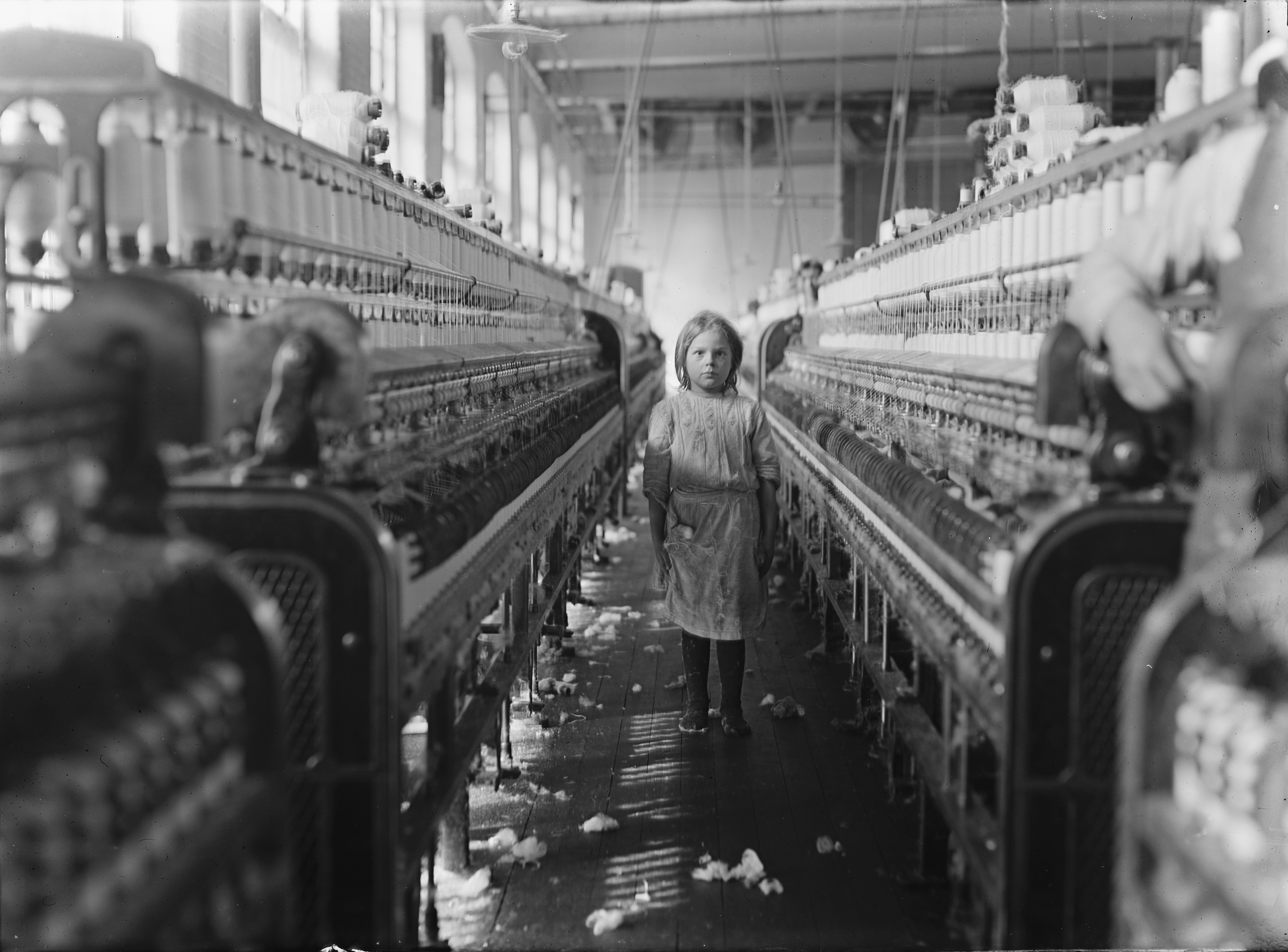
Muckraking photographs by Lewis Hine of children at work mobilized public support for laws raising the minimum age for employment.

Progressive era reformers 1890s to 1920s reoriented the issue of poverty and its cures to combat poverty through systematic sociological research. Catalyzed by Henry George's 1879 book Progress and Poverty, public interest became concerned in how poverty could persist even in a time of economic progress. Reformers rejected the outmoded laissez-faire approach and called for action through local government and private philanthropy. The rhetoric shifted from "relief" for the poor to more general "welfare" for everyone. Their rhetoric shifted the spotlight from the unemployed father to the impoverished children. Reformers emphasized publicity, and had support from the newspapers and from private welfare organizations. The first round of success came with raising the Legal working age to reduce Child labor.

Various social services were also expanded during the course of the Progressive Era. On a state and local level, a steady increase took place in the provision of public services such as health facilities and institutional care of the destitute and handicapped. Milk codes were drawn up in most cities, while milk depots were set up. As noted by one study, these depots "sold milk at cost or provided it free of charge for needy persons." Progress was made in tackling slum housing, while city governments established a wide range of services. These included free school meals for poor school children, free dental and medical examinations for school children, day nurseries, baby clinics, and public playgrounds. Mothers' pensions were also set up in various states; designed to help widows in need.

In 1894 and 1895, Mayor of Detroit Hazen S. Pingree set up "potato patches" using vacant lots where several thousand unemployed families could grow their own food, especially potatoes.

== Labor policy and unions ==
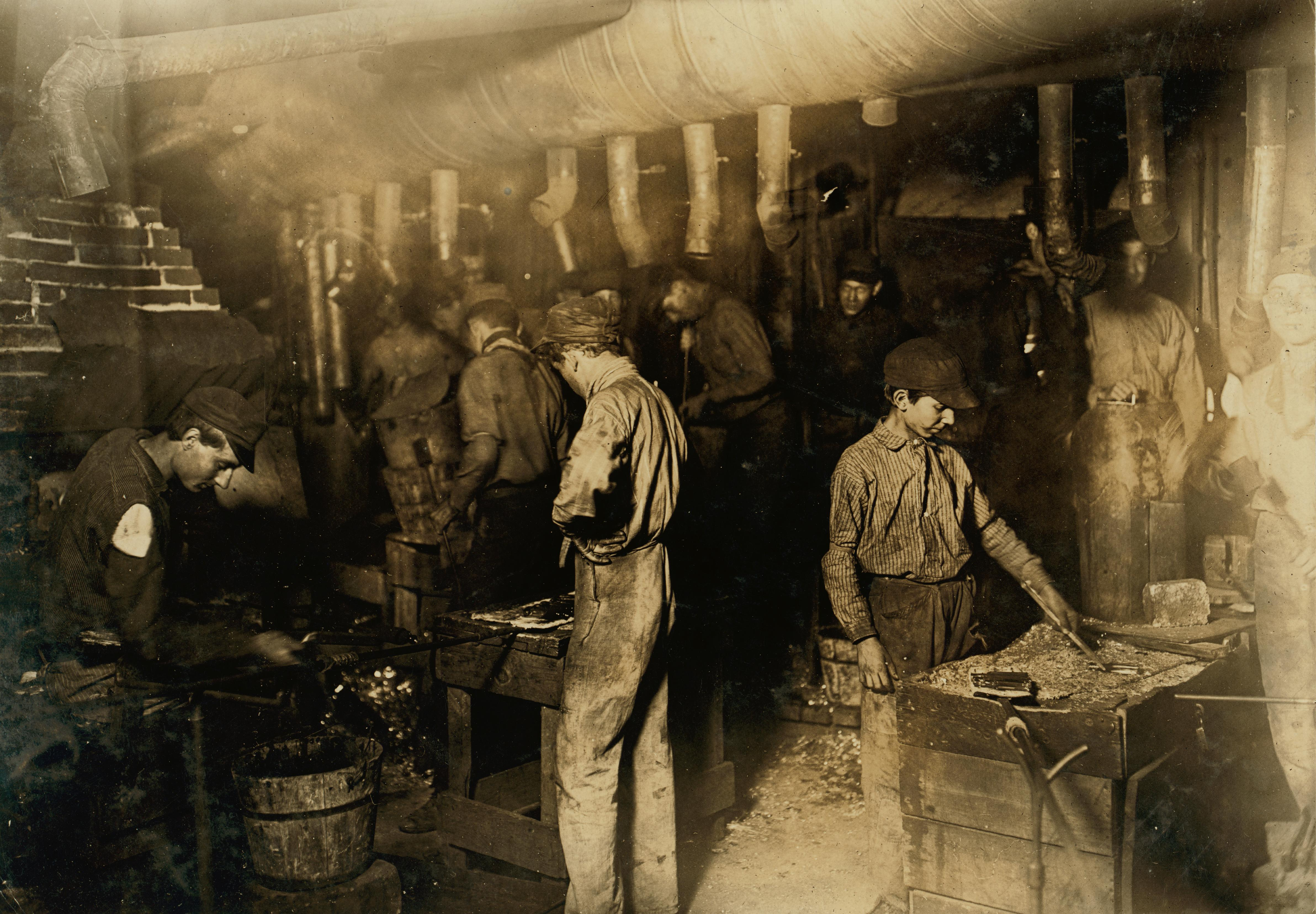
Glass works in Indiana, from a 1908 photograph by Lewis Hine

There were many dramatic changes in the condition of American workers from 1915 to 2015.

Labor unions, especially those affiliated with the American Federation of Labor (AFL), grew rapidly in the early 20th century, and had a progressive agenda as well. After experimenting in the early 20th century with cooperation with business in the National Civic Federation, the AFL turned after 1906 to a working political alliance with the Democratic Party. The alliance was especially important in the larger industrial cities. The unions wanted restrictions on judges who intervened in labor disputes, usually on the side of the employer. They finally achieved that goal with the Norris–La Guardia Act of 1932.

In September 1916, the Federal Employees' Compensation Act introduced benefits to workers who are injured or contract illnesses in the workplace. The act established an agency responsible for federal workers' compensation, which was transferred to the Labor Department in the 1940s and has become known as the Office of Workers' Compensation Programs.

Several other laws aimed at helping working people were passed during the course of the Progressive Era.

== Women ==
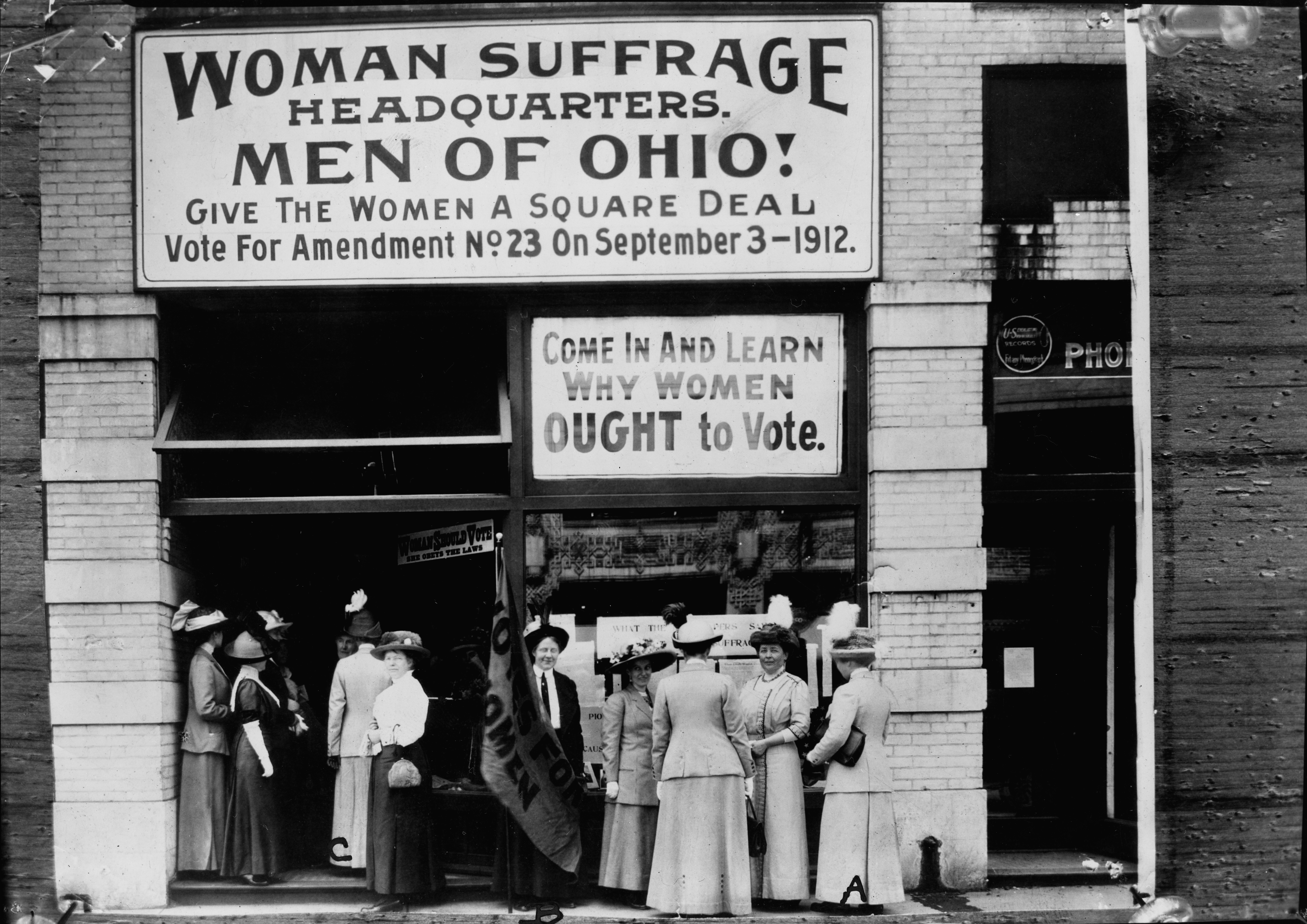
In 1912, women's suffrage headquarters reached out to men in Cleveland, Ohio.

Across the nation, middle-class women organized on behalf of social reforms during the Progressive Era. Using the language of municipal housekeeping women were able to push such reforms as prohibition, women's suffrage, child-saving, and public health.

Middle-class women formed local clubs, which after 1890 were coordinated by the General Federation of Women's Clubs (GFWC). Historian Paige Meltzer puts the GFWC in the context of the Progressive Movement, arguing that its policies:

built on Progressive-era strategies of municipal housekeeping. During the Progressive era, female activists used traditional constructions of womanhood, which imagined all women as mothers and homemakers, to justify their entrance into community affairs: as "municipal housekeepers", they would clean up politics, cities, and see after the health and well-being of their neighbors. Donning the mantle of motherhood, female activists methodically investigated their community's needs and used their "maternal" expertise to lobby, create, and secure a place for themselves in an emerging state welfare bureaucracy, best illustrated perhaps by clubwoman Julia Lathrop's leadership in the Children's Bureau. As part of this tradition of maternal activism, the Progressive-era General Federation supported a range of causes from the pure food and drug administration to public health care for mothers and children, to a ban on child labor, each of which looked to the state to help implement their vision of social justice.

Some activists demanded change, and questioned the old thinking regarding marriage and sexuality. They craved more sexual freedom following the sexually repressive and restrictive Victorian era. Dating became a new way of courting during the Progressive Era and moved youth into a more romantic way of viewing marriage and relationships. Within more engagements and marriages, both parties would exchange love notes as a way to express their sexual feelings. The divide between aggressive passionate love associated usually with men and a women's more spiritual romantic love became apparent in the middle class as women were judged on how they should be respected based on how they expressed these feelings. So, frequently women expressed passionless emotions towards love as a way to establish status among men in the middle class.

=== Women's suffrage ===
The National American Woman Suffrage Association (NAWSA) was an American women's rights organization formed in May 1890 as a unification of the National Woman Suffrage Association (NWSA) and the American Woman Suffrage Association (AWSA). The NAWSA set up hundreds of smaller local and state groups, with the goal of passing woman suffrage legislation at the state and local level. The NAWSA was the largest and most important suffrage organization in the United States, and was the primary promoter of women's right to vote. Carrie Chapman Catt was the key leader in the early 20th century. Like AWSA and NWSA before it, the NAWSA pushed for a constitutional amendment guaranteeing women's voting rights, and was instrumental in winning the ratification of the Nineteenth Amendment to the United States Constitution in 1920. A breakaway group, the National Woman's Party, tightly controlled by Alice Paul, used civil disobedience to gain publicity and force passage of suffrage. Paul's members chained themselves to the White House fence to get arrested, then went on hunger strikes to gain publicity. While the British suffragettes stopped their protests in 1914 and supported the British war effort, Paul began her campaign in 1917 and was widely criticized for ignoring the war and attracting radical anti-war elements.

A lesser-known feminist movement in the progressive era was the self-defense movement. According to Wendy Rouse, feminists sought to raise awareness about the sexual harassment and violence that women faced on the street, at work, and in the home. They wanted to inspire a sense of physical and personal empowerment through training in active self-defense.

== Civil rights ==
=== African Americans and race relations ===
Across the South, black communities developed their own Progressive reform projects. Typical projects involved upgrading schools, modernizing church operations, expanding business opportunities, fighting for a larger share of state budgets, and engaging in legal action to secure equal rights. Reform projects were especially notable in rural areas, where the great majority of Southern blacks lived.

Rural blacks were heavily affected by environmental issues, in which they developed their own traditions and priorities. George Washington Carver (1860–1943) was a leader in promoting environmentalism, and was well known for his research projects, particularly those involving agriculture.

Although there were some achievements that improved conditions for African Americans and other non-white minorities, the Progressive Era was still in the midst of the nadir of American race relations. While white Progressives in principle believed in improving conditions for minority groups, there were wide differences in how this was to be achieved. Some, such as Lillian Wald, fought to alleviate the plight of poor African Americans. Many, though, were concerned with enforcing, not eradicating, racial segregation. In particular, the mixing of black and white pleasure-seekers in "black-and-tan" clubs troubled Progressive reformers. The Progressive ideology espoused by many of the era attempted to correct societal problems created by racial integration following the Civil War by segregating the races and allowing each group to achieve its own potential; most Progressives saw racial integration as a problem to be solved, rather than a goal to be achieved. As white Progressives sought to help the white working class, clean up politics, and improve the cities, the country instated the system of racial segregation known as Jim Crow.

Legal historian Herbert Hovenkap argues that while many early progressives inherited the racism of Jim Crow, as they began to innovate their own ideas, they would embrace behaviorism, cultural relativism, and marginalism, which stress environmental influences on humans rather than biological inheritance. He states that ultimately Progressives "were responsible for bringing scientific racism to an end".

== Key political reform efforts ==
=== Democracy ===
Many progressives sought to enable the citizenry to rule more directly and circumvent machines, bosses and professional politicians. The institution of the initiative and referendums made it possible to pass laws without the involvement of the legislature, while the recall allowed for the removal of corrupt or under-performing officials, and the direct primary let people democratically nominate candidates, avoiding the professionally dominated conventions. Thanks to the efforts of Oregon State Representative William S. U'Ren and his Direct Legislation League, voters in Oregon overwhelmingly approved a ballot measure in 1902 that created the initiative and referendum processes for citizens to directly introduce or approve proposed laws or amendments to the state constitution, making Oregon the first state to adopt such a system. U'Ren also helped in the passage of an amendment in 1908 that gave voters power to recall elected officials, and would go on to establish, at the state level, popular election of US Senators and the first presidential primary in the United States. In 1911, California governor Hiram Johnson established the Oregon System of "Initiative, Referendum, and Recall" in his state, viewing them as good influences for citizen participation against the historic influence of large corporations on state lawmakers. These Progressive reforms were soon replicated in other states, including Idaho, Washington, and Wisconsin, and today roughly half of US states have initiative, referendum and recall provisions in their state constitutions.

The Seventeenth Amendment was ratified in 1913, requiring that all senators be elected by the people (they were formerly appointed by state legislatures). The main motivation was to reduce the power of political bosses, who controlled the Senate seats by virtue of their control of state legislatures. The result, according to political scientist Henry Jones Ford, was that the United States Senate had become a "Diet of party lords, wielding their power without scruple or restraint, on behalf of those particular interests" that put them in office.

Reformers also sought to streamline government through the introduction of the short ballot. By reducing the number of elected officials and consolidating their power in singular officials like a governor they hoped to increase accountability and clarity in government. Woodrow Wilson was at one point the President of the National Short Ballot Organization.

==== Direct primary ====
The direct primary became important at the state level starting in the 1890s and at the local level in the 1900s. However, presidential nominations depended chiefly on state party conventions until 1972.

The first primary elections came in the Democratic Party in the South starting in Louisiana in 1892. By 1897, in 11 Southern and border states, the Democratic Party held primaries to select candidates. Unlike the final election run by government officials, primaries are run by party officials, making it easy to discriminate against black voters in the era of Jim Crow. The US Supreme Court declared the white primary unconstitutional in Smith v. Allwright in 1944.

Insurgent Midwestern Republicans began promoting primaries starting in 1890 with Robert M. La Follette of Wisconsin. He crusaded against Stalwart party bosses of the state Republican Party, and won voter approval in a referendum in 1904. While La Follette always won his primary, that was not necessarily the case with other progressives. For example, his son Bob La Follette lost his Senate seat in the 1946 primary to Joseph McCarthy, a much more energetic candidate.

In New Jersey, on the other hand, the party leaders introduced the primary in every county by 1902. Their goal was to keep the various factions united for the fall campaign and minimize ticket-splitting.

The Northeast was laggard in adopting the direct primary, with Connecticut and Rhode Island the last states to sign up. The Massachusetts Democratic Party were gravely weakened by the primary system. New York Republican Governor Charles Evans Hughes made a primary law his top goal in 1909 and failed.

=== Urbanization and municipal reform ===
A coalition of middle-class reform-oriented voters, academic experts, and reformers hostile to the political machines started forming in the 1890s and introduced a series of reforms in urban America, designed to reduce waste, inefficiency and corruption, by introducing scientific methods, compulsory education and administrative innovations.

The pace was set in Detroit, Michigan, where Republican mayor Hazen S. Pingree first put together the reform coalition as mayor 1889–1897. Many cities set up municipal reference bureaus to study the budgets and administrative structures of local governments.

Progressive mayors took the lead in many key cities, such as Cleveland, Ohio (especially Mayor Tom Johnson); Toledo, Ohio; Jersey City, New Jersey; Los Angeles; Memphis, Tennessee; Louisville, Kentucky; and many other cities, especially in the western states. In Illinois, Governor Frank Lowden undertook a major reorganization of state government. In Wisconsin, the stronghold of Robert La Follette, the Wisconsin Idea used the state university as a major source of ideas and expertise.

==== Gary Plan for efficient public schools ====
The Gary Plan was much discussed method of building a highly efficient public school system. It was in part inspired by the educational ideas of philosopher John Dewey. It was designed by School Superintendent William Wirt in 1907 and implemented in the newly built steel mill city of Gary, Indiana. Reformers tried to copy it across the country. Wirt later promoted it in New York City. In New York City it was strongly opposed by unions and local political forces and was reversed in 1917. By 1929 over 200 cities in 41 states adopted variations of the plan. Ronald Cohen states that the Gary Plan was popular because it merged Progressive commitments to:

paedagogical and economic efficiency, growth and centralization of administration, an expanded curriculum, introduction of measurement and testing, greater public use of school facilities, a child-centered approach, and heightened concern about using the schools to properly socialize children.

==== Cities during the Progressive Era ====
In the early 1900s, the United States entered a period of peace, prosperity, and progress. In the nation's growing cities, factory output grew, small businesses flourished, and incomes rose. As the promise of jobs and higher wages attracted more and more people into the cities, the US began to shift to a nation of city-dwellers. By 1900, 30 million people, or 30 percent of the total population, lived in cities.

The mass migration of people into the cities enriched some people but caused severe problems for others. For the emerging middle class, benefiting from growing incomes and increases in leisure time, the expanding city offered many advantages. Department stores, chain stores, and shopping centers emerged to meet the growing demand for material goods. Parks, amusement parks, and baseball stadiums were built to meet aesthetic and recreational needs. Transportation systems improved, as did the general infrastructure, better meeting the increased needs of the middle and upper class city dwellers.

Thousands of poor people also lived in the cities. Lured by the promise of prosperity, many rural families and immigrants from throughout the world arrived in the cities to work in the factories. It is estimated that by 1904 one in three people living in the cities was close to starving to death. For many of the urban poor, living in the city resulted in a decreased quality of life. With few city services to rely upon, the working class lived daily with overcrowding, inadequate water facilities, unpaved streets, and disease. Lagging far behind the middle class, working class wages provided little more than subsistence living and few, if any, opportunities for movement out of the city slums.

===== Business progressivism in 1920s =====
What historians have identified as "business progressivism", with its emphasis on efficiency and typified by Henry Ford and Herbert Hoover reached an apogee in the 1920s. Wik, for example, argues that Ford's "views on technology and the mechanization of rural America were generally enlightened, progressive, and often far ahead of his times."

Tindall stresses the continuing importance of the progressive movement in the South in the 1920s involving increased democracy, efficient government, corporate regulation, social justice, and governmental public service. William Link finds political Progressivism dominant in most of the South in the 1920s. Likewise it was influential in the Midwest.

Historians of women and of youth emphasize the strength of the progressive impulse in the 1920s. Women consolidated their gains after the success of the suffrage movement, and moved into causes such as world peace, good government, maternal care (the Sheppard–Towner Act of 1921), and local support for education and public health. The work was not nearly as dramatic as the suffrage crusade, but women voted and operated quietly and effectively. Paul Fass, speaking of youth, says "Progressivism as an angle of vision, as an optimistic approach to social problems, was very much alive." International influences that sparked many reform ideas likewise continued into the 1920s, as American ideas of modernity began to influence Europe.

By 1930, a block of progressive Republicans in the Senate were urging Hoover to take more vigorous action to fight the depression. Hoover himself had sharply moved to the right, and paid little attention to their liberal ideas. By 1932, this group was moving toward support for Roosevelt's New Deal. They remained staunch isolationists deeply opposed to any involvement in Europe.

==== Automobiles ====
Sociologists Robert and Helen Lynd conducted a major study of American society during the 1920s. One of their findings was that the automobile had transformed the lives of people living in Middletown and, by extension, virtually everywhere else in the United States.

More specifically, the Lynds found that the automobile had such effects as the following: (1) family budgets had changed dramatically; (2) ministers complained that people drove their cars rather than going to church; (3) parents were concerned that their boys and girls were spending too much time together "motoring"; and (4) the car had revolutionized the way people spent their free time.

=== Rural reform ===
As late as 1920, half the population lived in rural areas. They experienced their own progressive reforms, typically with the explicit goal of upgrading country life. By 1910, most farmers subscribed to a farm newspaper, where editors promoted efficiency as applied to farming. Special efforts were made to reach the rural South and remote areas, such as the mountains of Appalachia and the Ozarks.

==== Good roads ====
The most urgent need was much better roads. The traditional method of putting the burden on maintaining roads on local landowners was increasingly inadequate. New York State took the lead in 1898, and by 1916 the old system had been discarded in every area. Demands grew for local and state government to take charge. With the coming of the automobile after 1910, urgent efforts were made to upgrade and modernize dirt roads designed for horse-drawn wagon traffic. The American Association for Highway Improvement was organized in 1910. Funding came from automobile registration, and taxes on motor fuels, as well as state aid. In 1916, federal aid was first made available to improve post-roads, and promote general commerce. Congress appropriated $75 million over a five-year period, with the Secretary of Agriculture in charge through the Bureau of Public Roads, in cooperation with the state highway departments. There were 2.4 million miles of rural dirt rural roads in 1914; 100,000 miles had been improved with grading and gravel, and 3000 miles were given high quality surfacing. The rapidly increasing speed of automobiles, and especially trucks, made maintenance and repair a high priority. Concrete was first used in 1933, and expanded until it became the dominant surfacing material in the 1930s. The South had fewer cars and trucks and much less money, but it worked through highly visible demonstration projects like the "Dixie Highway".

==== Rural schools ====
Rural schools were often poorly funded, one room operations. Typically, classes were taught by young local women before they married, with only occasional supervision by county superintendents. The progressive solution was modernization through consolidation, with the result of children attending modern schools. There they would be taught by full-time professional teachers who had graduated from the states' teachers colleges, were certified, and were monitored by the county superintendents. Farmers complained at the expense, and also at the loss of control over local affairs, but in state after state the consolidation process went forward.

Numerous other programs were aimed at rural youth, including 4-H clubs, Boy Scouts and Girl Scouts. County fairs not only gave prizes for the most productive agricultural practices, they also demonstrated those practices to an attentive rural audience. Programs for new mothers included maternity care and training in baby care.

=== Conservation of natural resources ===
In the mid to late 19th century, natural resources were heavily exploited, especially in the West. Land speculators and developers took over large tracts of forests and grazing land. Acreage important to waterpower was seized by private concerns. Mining companies practiced improper and wasteful mining practices. Assuming a seemingly inexhaustible supply of natural resources, Americans developed a "tradition of waste".

Alarmed by the public's casual attitude toward natural resources as well as the exploitation of natural resources for private gain, conservationists called for federal supervision of the nation's resources and the preservation of those resources for future generations. In Theodore Roosevelt, the conservationists found an energetic leader. Conservation of the nation's resources, putting an end to wasteful uses of raw materials, and the reclamation of large areas of neglected land have been identified as some of the major achievements of the Roosevelt era.

Roosevelt's concern for the environment was influenced by American naturalists, such as John Muir, and by his own political appointees, especially Gifford Pinchot, Chief of Forestry. Working in concert with many individuals and organizations, the Roosevelt administration was responsible for the following: the Newlands Act of 1902, which funded irrigation projects from the proceeds of the sale of federal lands in the West; the appointment of the Inland Waterways Commission in 1907 to study the relation of rivers, soil, forest, waterpower development, and water transportation; and the National Conservation Commission of 1909, which was charged with drawing up long-range plans for preserving national resources. Along with a vocal group of conservationists, the Roosevelt administration created an environmental conservation movement whose words and actions continue to be heard and felt throughout the US today.

=== Modern versus traditional conflicts ===
The movement's attempts at introducing urban reforms to rural America often met resistance from traditionalists who saw the country-lifers as aggressive modernizers who were condescending and out of touch with rural life. The traditionalists said many of their reforms were unnecessary and not worth the trouble of implementing. Rural residents also disagreed with the notion that farms needed to improve their efficiency, as they saw this goal as serving urban interests more than rural ones. The social conservatism of many rural residents also led them to resist attempts for change led by outsiders. Most important, the traditionalists did not want to become modern, and did not want their children inculcated with alien modern values through comprehensive schools that were remote from local control. The most successful reforms came from the farmers who pursued agricultural extension, as their proposed changes were consistent with existing modernizing trends toward more efficiency and more profit in agriculture.

=== Constitutional change ===
The Progressives fixed some of their reforms into law by adding amendments 16, 17, 18, and 19 to the Constitution of the United States. The 16th amendment made an income tax legal (this required an amendment due to Article One, Section 9 of the Constitution, which required that direct taxes be laid on the States in proportion to their population as determined by the decennial census). The Progressives also made strides in attempts to reduce political corruption through the 17th amendment (direct election of U.S. Senators). The most radical and controversial amendment came during the anti-German craze of World War I that helped the Progressives and others push through their plan for prohibition through the 18th amendment (once the Progressives fell out of power the 21st amendment repealed the 18th in 1933). The ratification of the 19th amendment in 1920, which recognized women's suffrage was the last amendment during the progressive era. Another significant constitutional change that began during the progressive era was the incorporation of the Bill of Rights so that those rights would apply to the states. In 1920, Benjamin Gitlow was convicted under the Espionage Act of 1917 and the case went all the way to the Supreme Court, where the justices decided that the First Amendment applied to the states as well as the federal government. Prior to that time, the Bill of Rights was considered to apply only to the federal government, not the states.

== National policy ==
=== National economic policy ===
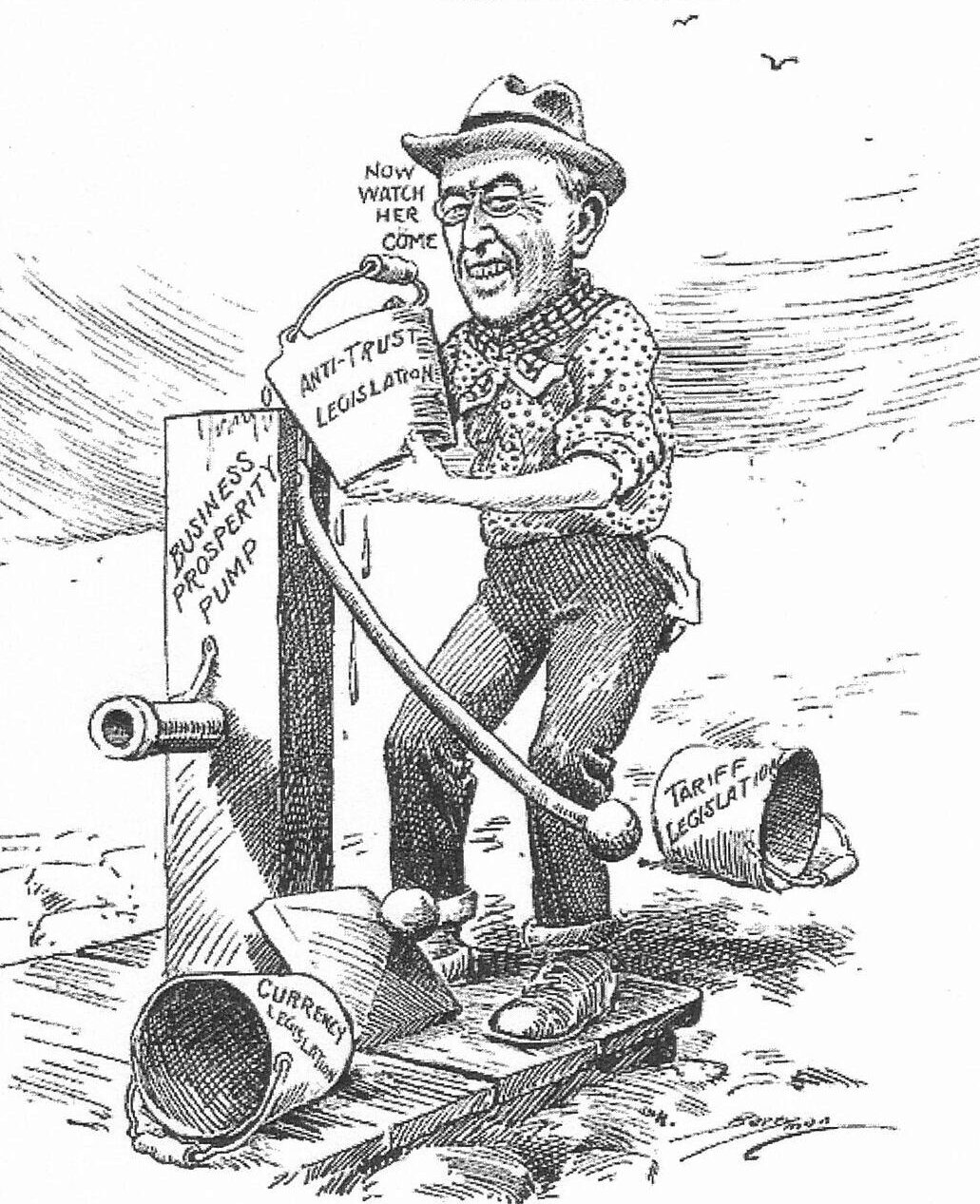
President Woodrow Wilson used tariff, currency, and antitrust laws to prime the pump and get the economy working.

The Progressive Era was one of general prosperity after the Panic of 1893—a severe depression—ended in 1897. The Panic of 1907 was short and mostly affected financiers. However, Campbell (2005) stresses the weak points of the economy in 1907–1914, linking them to public demands for more Progressive interventions. The Panic of 1907 was followed by a small decline in real wages and increased unemployment, with both trends continuing until World War I. Campbell emphasizes the resulting stress on public finance and the impact on the Wilson administration's policies. The weakened economy and persistent federal deficits led to changes in fiscal policy, including the imposition of federal income taxes on businesses and individuals and the creation of the Federal Reserve System. Government agencies were also transformed in an effort to improve administrative efficiency.

In the Gilded Age (late 19th century), the parties were reluctant to involve the federal government too heavily in the private sector, except in the area of railroads and tariffs. In general, they accepted the concept of laissez-faire, a doctrine opposing government interference in the economy except to maintain law and order. This attitude started to change during the depression of the 1890s when small business, farm, and labor movements began asking the government to intercede on their behalf.

By the start of the 20th century, a middle class had developed that was weary of both the business elite and the radical political movements of farmers and laborers in the Midwest and West. The progressives argued the need for government regulation of business practices to ensure competition and free enterprise. Congress enacted a law regulating railroads in 1887 (the Interstate Commerce Act), and one preventing large firms from controlling a single industry in 1890 (the Sherman Antitrust Act). These laws were not rigorously enforced, however, until the years between 1900 and 1920, when Republican President Theodore Roosevelt (1901–1909), Democratic President Woodrow Wilson (1913–1921), and others sympathetic to the views of the Progressives came to power. Many of today's US regulatory agencies were created during these years, including the Interstate Commerce Commission and the Federal Trade Commission. Muckrakers were journalists who encouraged readers to demand more regulation of business. Upton Sinclair's The Jungle (1906) was influential and persuaded America about the supposed horrors of the Chicago Union Stock Yards, a giant complex of meat processing plants that developed in the 1870s. The federal government responded to Sinclair's book and the Neill–Reynolds Report with the new regulatory Food and Drug Administration. Ida Tarbell wrote a series of articles against Standard Oil, which was perceived to be a monopoly. This affected both the government and the public reformers. Attacks by Tarbell and others helped pave the way for public acceptance of the breakup of the company by the Supreme Court in 1911.

When Democrat Woodrow Wilson was elected president with a Democratic Congress in 1912 he implemented a series of Progressive policies in economics. In 1913, the Sixteenth Amendment was ratified, and a small income tax was imposed on higher incomes. The Democrats lowered tariffs with the Underwood Tariff in 1913, though its effects were overwhelmed by the changes in trade caused by the World War that broke out in 1914. Wilson proved especially effective in mobilizing public opinion behind tariff changes by denouncing corporate lobbyists, addressing Congress in person in highly dramatic fashion, and staging an elaborate ceremony when he signed the bill into law. Wilson helped end the long battles over the trusts with the Clayton Antitrust Act of 1914. He managed to convince lawmakers on the issues of money and banking by the creation in 1913 of the Federal Reserve System, a complex business–government partnership that to this day dominates the financial world.

==== Antitrust under Roosevelt and Taft ====
Roosevelt's antitrust record over eight years included 18 civil cases and 26 criminal antitrust cases resulting in 22 convictions and 22 acquittals. Taft's four years had 54 civil and 36 criminal suits and Taft's prosecutor secured 55 convictions and 35 acquittals. Taft's cases included many leading firms in major sectors: Standard Oil; American Tobacco; United States Steel; Aluminum Company of America; International Harvester; National Cash Register; Westinghouse; General Electric; Kodak; Dupont; Union Pacific railroad; and Southern Pacific railroad. It also included trusts or combinations in beef, lumber, wine, turpentine, wallpaper, licorice, thread, and watches. The targets even included operations run by Taft's personal friends, such as Ohio-based National Cash Register. The media gave extensive exposure, especially to cases against Standard Oil and American Tobacco, which reached directly tens of millions of consumers. Taft's attorney general George W. Wickersham personally supervised the most important cases against Standard Oil and American Tobacco. He argued to the Supreme Court that trusts should be dissolved into their constituent parts, arguing they were artificial creations and did not achieve their positions through normal business methods and hence were guilty of violating the Sherman act. The government brief argued that dismemberment would correct this inequity and would force and restore normal competition. The Court agreed in 1911 and ordered the Justice Department to draw up complete reorganization plans in six months. Wickersham and his staff, all expert lawyers, were not experts in business management. The hurriedly created over thirty new corporations to replace Standard, plus several in tobacco.

After reorganizations prices to consumers went up, as the replacement firms lost the size efficiency of the trust. Wickersham discovered that trust busting meant higher prices for consumers. He told Taft, "the disintegrated companies of both the oil and tobacco trust are spending many times what was formerly spent by anyone in advertising in the newspapers." Wickersham realized the problem but Taft never did. He insisted that antitrust lawsuits continue to the end; 16 new cases were launched in the last 2 months of the Taft administration.

== Immigration policy ==
The influx of immigration grew steadily after 1896, with most new arrivals being unskilled workers from Eastern and Southern Europe. These immigrants were able to find work in the steel mills, slaughterhouses, and construction crews of the mill towns and industrial cities in the Northeast and Midwest. Many went to rural mining districts. Few went to the South. Many intended to stay a few years, save up their wages by living frugally, and return to the homeland with enough cash to buy a small farm. However, Jewish immigrants were all permanent.

The influx ended abruptly in August 1914 as World War I halted almost all civilian movement to and from Europe. Starting in the 1880s, the labor unions aggressively promoted restrictions on immigration, especially restrictions on Chinese, Japanese, and Korean immigrants. In combination with the racist attitudes of the time, there was a fear that large numbers of unskilled, low-paid workers would defeat the union's efforts to raise wages through collective bargaining. In addition, rural Protestants distrusted the urban Catholic and Jewish immigrants from Eastern and Southern Europe, and on those grounds opposed immigration. On the other hand, the rapid growth of industry called for a greater and expanding labor pool that could not be met by natural birth rates. As a result, many large corporations were opposed to immigration restrictions. By the early 1920s, a consensus had been reached that the total influx of immigration had to be restricted, and a series of laws in the 1920s accomplished that purpose. A handful of eugenics advocates were also involved in immigration restriction for their own pseudo-scientific reasons. Immigration restriction continued to be a national policy until after World War II.

During World War I, the Progressives strongly promoted Americanization programs, designed to modernize the recent immigrants and turn them into model American citizens, while diminishing loyalties to the old country. These programs often operated through the public school system, which expanded dramatically.

The Immigration Act of 1924 was a federal law that prevented immigration from Asia and set quotas on the number of immigrants from Eastern and Southern Europe. It also authorized the creation of the country's first formal border control service, the US Border Patrol, and established a "consular control system" that allowed entry only to those who first obtained a visa from a US consulate abroad.

== Foreign policy ==
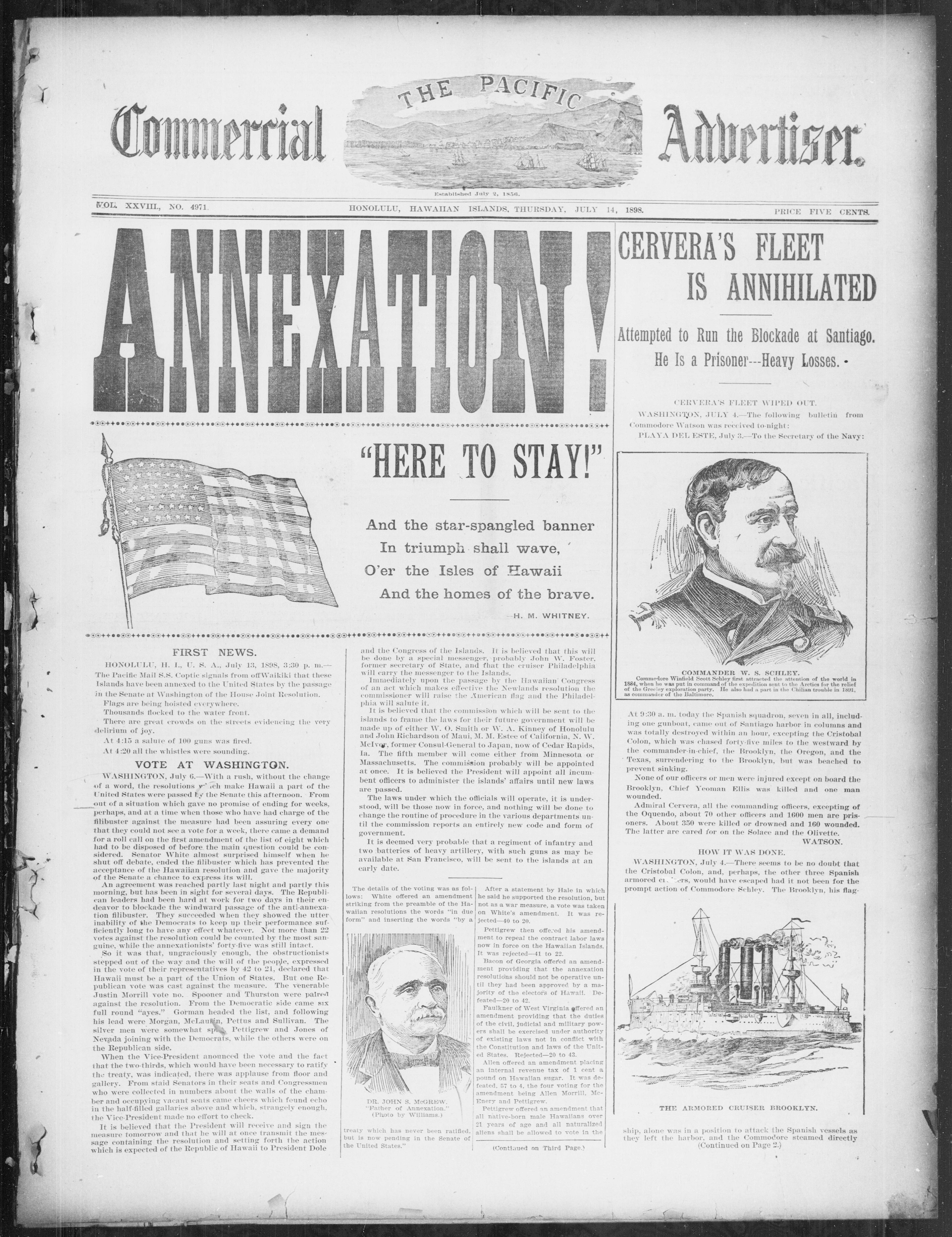
Newspaper reporting the annexation of the Republic of Hawaii in 1898

Progressives looked to legal arbitration as an alternative to warfare. The two leading proponents were Taft, a constitutional lawyer who later became Chief Justice, and Democratic leader William Jennings Bryan. Taft's political base was the conservative business community which largely supported peace movements before 1914. The businessmen believed that economic rivalries were cause of war, and that extensive trade led to an interdependent world that would make war a very expensive and useless anachronism. One early success came in the Newfoundland fisheries dispute between the United States and Britain in 1910. In 1911, Taft's diplomats signed wide-ranging arbitration treaties with France and Britain. However he was defeated by former President Theodore Roosevelt, who had broken with his protégé Taft in 1910. They were dueling for control of the Republican Party and Roosevelt encouraged the Senate to impose amendments that significantly weakened the treaties. On the one hand, Roosevelt was acting to sabotage Taft's campaign promises. At a deeper level, Roosevelt truly believed that arbitration was a naive solution and the great issues had to be decided by warfare. Roosevelt's approach incorporated a near-mystical faith of the ennobling nature of war. It endorsed jingoistic nationalism as opposed to the businessmen's calculation of profit and national interest.

Foreign policy in the Progressive Era was often marked by a tone of moral supremacy. Woodrow Wilson and William Jennings Bryan both saw themselves as "Missionaries of Democracy", with the deliberate religious overtone. Historian Arthur S. Link says they felt they were, "Inspired by the confidence that they knew better how to promote the peace and well-being of other countries than did the leaders of those countries themselves." Similar ideas and language had already been used previously in the Monroe Doctrine, wherein Roosevelt claimed that the United States could serve as the police of the world, using its power to end unrest and wrongdoing on the western hemisphere. Using this moralistic approach, Roosevelt argued for intervention with Cuba to help it to become a "just and stable civilization", by way of the Platt Amendment. Wilson used a similar moralistic tone when dealing with Mexico. In 1913, while revolutionaries took control of the government, Wilson judged them to be immoral, and refused to acknowledge the in-place government on that reason alone.

=== Keeping and modernizing the Philippines ===
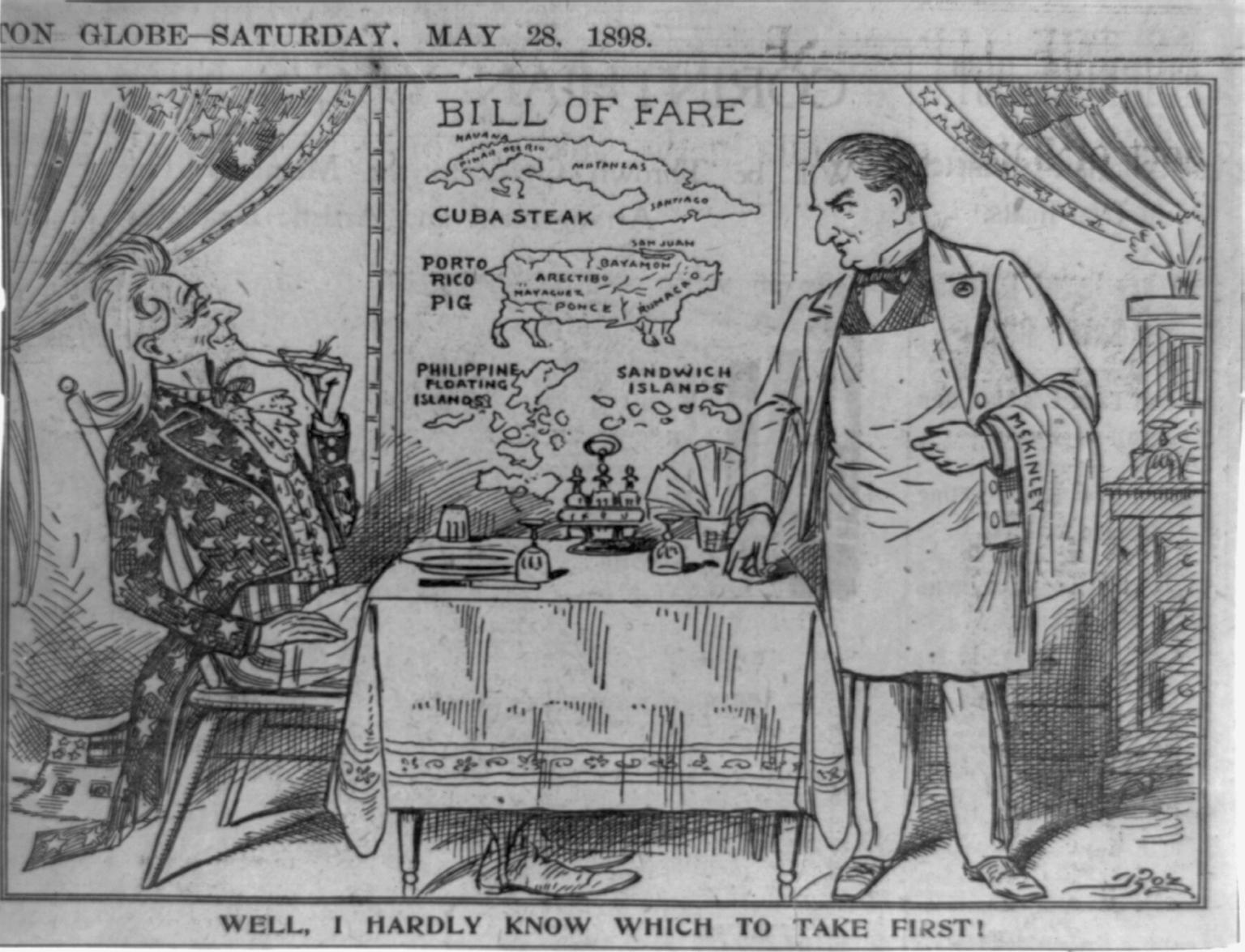
A cartoon of Uncle Sam seated in restaurant looking at the bill of fare containing "Cuba steak", "Porto Rico pig", the "Philippine Islands", and the "Sandwich Islands" (Hawaii)

The Philippines was acquired in 1899, after victory in the Spanish–American War. It was the largest colonial acquisition by the United States in an era when the world powers were seizing colonies in Africa and Asia. While anti-imperialist sentiments had been prevalent in the United States since the 1850s, the acquisition of the Philippines sparked an intense debate. Anti-imperialists insisted that keeping the islands was "un-American" and unwise.

The Philippines was a major target for the progressive reformers. A 1907 report to Secretary of War Taft provided a summary of what the American civil administration had achieved. It included, in addition to the rapid building of a public school system based on English teaching, and boasted about such modernizing achievements as:

steel and concrete wharves at the newly renovated Port of Manila; dredging the River Pasig; streamlining of the Insular Government; accurate, intelligible accounting; the construction of a telegraph and cable communications network; the establishment of a postal savings bank; large-scale road- and bridge-building; impartial and incorrupt policing; well-financed civil engineering; the conservation of old Spanish architecture; large public parks; a bidding process for the right to build railways; Corporation law; and a coastal and geological survey.

In 1903, the American reformers in the Philippines passed two major land acts designed to turn landless peasants into owners of their farms. By 1905, the law was clearly a failure. Reformers such as Taft believed landownership would turn unruly agrarians into loyal subjects. The social structure in rural Philippines was highly traditional and highly unequal. Drastic changes in land ownership posed a major challenge to local elites, who would not accept it, nor would their peasant clients. The American reformers blamed peasant resistance to landownership for the law's failure and argued that large plantations and sharecropping was the Philippines' best path to development.

Elite Filipina women played a major role in the reform movement, especially on health issues. They specialized on urgent needs such as infant care, maternal and child health, the distribution of pure milk, and teaching new mothers about children's health. The most prominent organizations were the La Protección de la Infancia, and the National Federation of Women's Clubs.

=== Peace movement ===
Although the Progressive Era was characterized by public support for World War I under Woodrow Wilson, there was also a substantial opposition to the war. Jane Addams was the most prominent leader.

== Societal reforms ==
=== Rhetoric of righteousness ===
Mainline Protestant denominations adopted the Social Gospel. The goal was to establish a more perfect society on earth in preparation for Christ's Second Coming. More generally the Social Gospel impulse was base on righteousness, typified by the wide influence of theologian Walter Rauschenbusch. The Presbyterians described the goal in 1910 by proclaiming:

The great ends of the church are the proclamation of the gospel for the salvation of humankind; the shelter, nurture, and spiritual fellowship of the children of God; the maintenance of divine worship; the preservation of truth; the promotion of social righteousness; and the exhibition of the Kingdom of Heaven to the world.

Many progressive leaders used the rhetoric of righteousness to motivate their Protestant supporters. Indeed, Richard Hofstadter argued that progressivism was, "a phase in the history of the Protestant conscience, a latter-day Protestant revival." Wilson and Bryan were moralistic and very religious; Roosevelt and La Follette were moralistic and not very religious.

Roosevelt's rhetoric was characterized by an intense moralism of personal righteousness. The tone was typified by his denunciation of "predatory wealth" in a message he sent Congress in January 1908 calling for passage of new labor laws:

Predatory wealth—of the wealth accumulated on a giant scale by all forms of iniquity, ranging from the oppression of wageworkers to unfair and unwholesome methods of crushing out competition, and to defrauding the public by stock jobbing and the manipulation of securities. Certain wealthy men of this stamp, whose conduct should be abhorrent to every man of ordinarily decent conscience, and who commit the hideous wrong of teaching our young men that phenomenal business success must ordinarily be based on dishonesty, have during the last few months made it apparent that they have banded together to work for a reaction. Their endeavor is to overthrow and discredit all who honestly administer the law, to prevent any additional legislation which would check and restrain them, and to secure if possible a freedom from all restraint which will permit every unscrupulous wrongdoer to do what he wishes unchecked provided he has enough money....The methods by which the Standard Oil people and those engaged in the other combinations of which I have spoken above have achieved great fortunes can only be justified by the advocacy of a system of morality which would also justify every form of criminality on the part of a labor union, and every form of violence, corruption, and fraud, from murder to bribery and ballot box stuffing in politics.

=== Prohibition ===
Prohibition was the outlawing of the manufacture, sale and transport of alcohol. Throughout the Progressive Era, it remained one of the prominent causes associated with progressivism at the local, state and national level, though support across the full breadth of Progressives was mixed. It pitted the minority urban Catholic population against the larger rural Protestant element, Progressivism's rise in the rural communities was aided by the general increase in public consciousness of social issues of the temperance movement, which achieved national success with the passage of the 18th Amendment by Congress in late 1917, and the ratification by three-fourths of the states in 1919. Prohibition was backed by the Methodists, Baptists, Congregationalists, Scandinavian Lutherans, and other evangelical churches. In the South, especially in Texas, prohibition was a top priority of the Protestant progressives. Activists were mobilized by the highly effective Anti-Saloon League.

In 1907, Georgia and Alabama were the first states to go dry followed by Oklahoma, Mississippi, North Carolina, and Tennessee. In 1913, Congress passed the Webb–Kenyon Act, which forbade the transport of liquor into dry states. By 1917, two-thirds of the states had some form of prohibition laws and roughly three-quarters of the population lived in dry areas. In 1913, the Anti-Saloon League first publicly appealed for a prohibition amendment. In August 1917, the Lever Food and Fuel Control Act banned production of distilled spirits for the duration of the war. The War Prohibition Act (November 1918) forbade the manufacture and sale of intoxicating beverages (more than 2.75% alcohol content) until the end of demobilization. In late 1917, Congress passed the Eighteenth Amendment; it was ratified in 1919 and took effect in January 1920. It prohibited the manufacturing, sale or transport of intoxicating beverages within the United States, as well as import and export. The Volstead Act (1919) defined intoxicating as having alcohol content greater than 0.5% and established the procedures for federal enforcement of the Act. The states were at liberty to enforce prohibition or not, and most did not try. Consumer demand, however, led to a variety of illegal sources for alcohol, especially illegal distilleries and smuggling. Prohibition also brought a rise to organized crime, which was able to profit off the sales of illegal alcohol. The Eighteenth Amendment was repealed in 1933, with the passage of the Twenty-First Amendment, thanks to a well-organized repeal campaign led by Catholics (who stressed personal liberty) and businessmen (who stressed the lost tax revenue).

=== Education ===
The reform of public schools was one of the prime concerns of the middle class during this period. The number of schools in the nation increased dramatically. The voice of the Progressive Education Movement in America was John Dewey. He argued, in books such as The Child and the Curriculum and Schools of Tomorrow, that, in addition to teaching academic content, schools should teach everyday skills and promote democratic participation. A higher level of education also gained popularity. By 1930, 12% of 18- to 21-year-olds were attending college, compared to 3% in 1890.

==== Women in home economics ====
A new field of study, the art and science of homemaking, emerged in an effort to feminize women's education in the United States. As the industrial revolution took hold of the American economy and as mass production, alienation, and urbanization appeared to be unstoppable trends, Americans looked for solutions that could soften the effects of change without slowing down the engines of progress.

Advocates argued that homemaking, as a profession, required education and training for the development of an efficient and systematic domestic practice. The curriculum aimed to cover a variety of topics, including teaching a standardized ways of gardening, child-rearing, cooking, cleaning, performing household maintenance, and doctoring. Such scientific management applied to the domestic sphere was presented as a solution to the dilemma black middle-class women faced in terms of searching for meaning and fulfillment in their role of housekeeping. The feminist perspective, by pushing for this type of education, intended to explain that women had separate but equally important responsibilities in life with men that required proper training.

==== Child labor and schooling ====
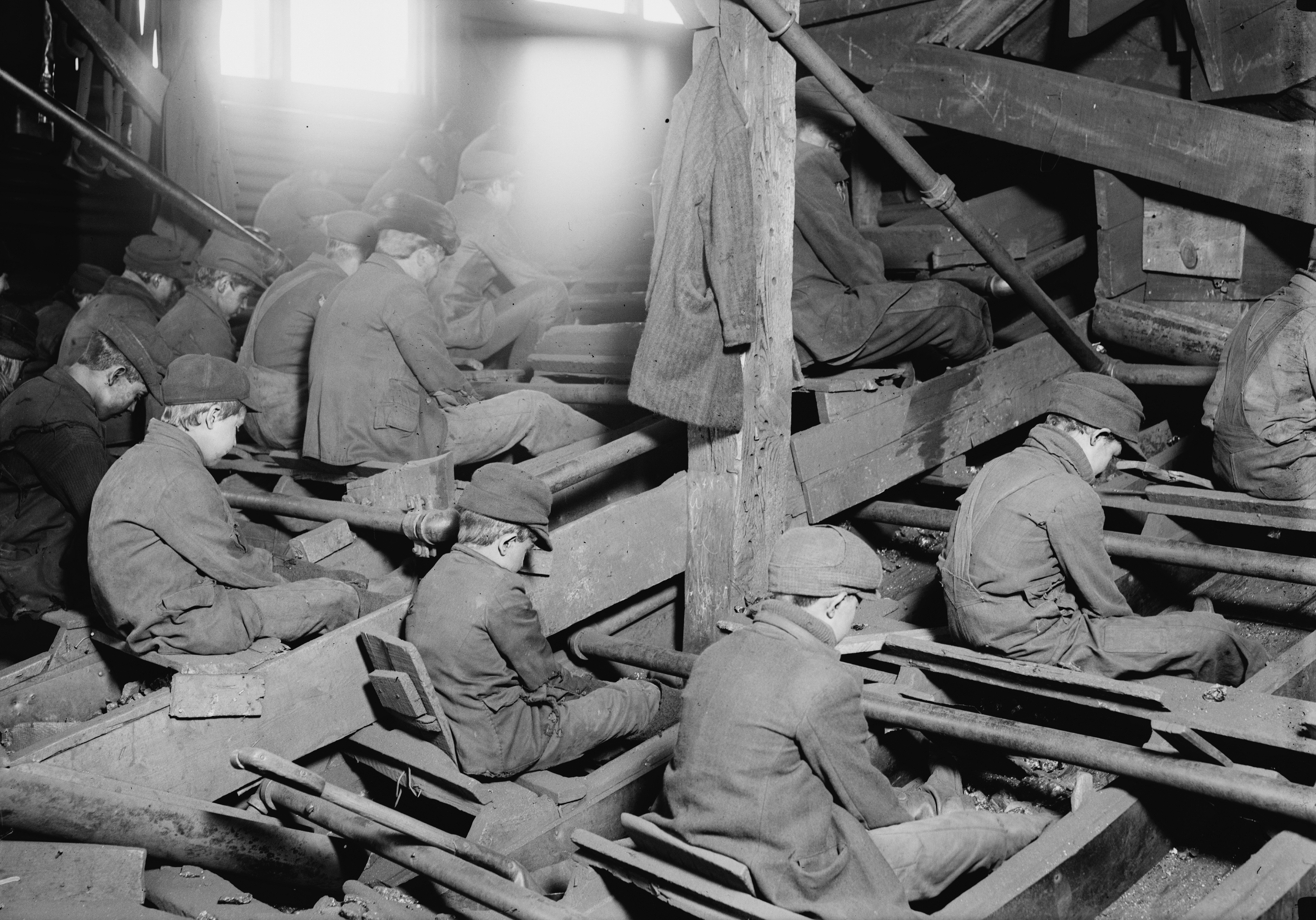
Breaker boys sort coal in an anthracite coal breaker near South Pittston, Pennsylvania, 1911

There was a concern towards working class children being taken out of school to be put straight to work. Progressives around the country put up campaigns to push for an improvement in public education and to make education mandatory. There were some less successful attempts in the South, where educational levels were far lower. The Southern Education Board came together to publicize the importance of reform. However, many rejected the reform. Farmers and workers relied heavily on their children to work and help the family's income. Immigrants were not for reform either, fearing that such a thing would Americanize their children.

Enrollment for children (age 5 to 19) in school rose from 51 percent to 59 between 1900 and 1909. Enrollment in public secondary school went from 519,000 to 841,000. School funds and the term of public schools also grew.

=== Medicine and law ===
The Flexner Report of 1910, sponsored by the Carnegie Foundation, professionalized American medicine by discarding the scores of local small medical schools and focusing national funds, resources, and prestige on larger, professionalized medical schools associated with universities. Prominent leaders included the Mayo Brothers whose Mayo Clinic in Rochester, Minnesota, became world-famous for innovative surgery.

In the legal profession, the American Bar Association set up in 1900 the Association of American Law Schools (AALS). It established national standards for law schools, which led to the replacement of the old system of young men studying law privately with established lawyers, by accredited law schools associated with universities.

=== Social sciences ===
Progressive scholars, based at the emerging research universities such as Harvard, Columbia, Johns Hopkins, Chicago, Michigan, Wisconsin, and California, worked to modernize their disciplines. The heyday of the amateur expert gave way to the research professor who published in the new scholarly journals and presses. Their explicit goal was to professionalize and make "scientific" the social sciences, especially history, economics, and political science. Professionalization meant creating new career tracks in the universities, with hiring and promotion dependent on meeting international models of scholarship.

=== Military ===
The Commission on Training Camp Activities sought to "socialize and Americanize" troops, especially native-born and foreign-born men, to meet the expected level of societal standards and integrate them into American culture. The ideology of the Commission was characterized by that of the Progressive Era, which strived against prostitution, alcoholism, social diseases, and poor sanitary conditions in major cities. The CTCA attempted to eradicate these problems from military training camps.

=== Eugenics ===
Some progressives sponsored eugenics as a solution to excessively large or underperforming families, hoping that birth control would enable parents to focus their resources on fewer, better children. Progressive leaders like Herbert Croly and Walter Lippmann indicated their classically liberal concern over the danger posed to the individual by the practice of eugenics.

== Decline ==
In the 1940s, historians typically saw the Progressive Era as a prelude to the New Deal and dated it from 1901 (when Roosevelt became president) to the start of World War I in 1914 or 1917. Historians have moved back in time emphasizing the Progressive reformers at the municipal and state levels in the 1890s. The Progressive political crusades were overshadowed in 1919 by violent confrontations with Bolsheviks (Communists), anarchists and violent strikes. The crusading element of progressivism thus largely ended, apart from prohibition, although business-oriented efficiency efforts continued.

Some historians who emphasize civil liberties decry their suppression during 1917–1919 and do not consider the war as rooted in Progressive policy. A strong anti-war movement headed by noted Progressives including Jane Addams, was suppressed by the Preparedness Movement and Wilson's 1916 re-election, a victory largely enabled by his campaign slogan, "He kept us out of the war." The slogan was no longer accurate by April 6 of the following year, when Wilson surprised much of the Progressive base that twice elected him and asked Congress to declare war on Germany. Some historians see the so-called "war to end all wars" as a globalized expression of the American Progressive movement, with Wilson's support for a League of Nations as its climax.

The politics of the 1920s was unfriendly toward the labor unions and liberal crusaders against business, so many if not most historians who emphasize those themes write off the decade. Urban cosmopolitan scholars recoiled at the moralism of prohibition, the intolerance of the nativists and the KKK, and on those grounds denounced the era. Richard Hofstadter, for example, in 1955 wrote that prohibition, "was a pseudo-reform, a pinched, parochial substitute for reform" that "was carried about America by the rural–evangelical virus". Arthur S. Link's argument for continuity through the 1920s stimulated a historiography that found Progressivism to be a potent force. Palmer, pointing to leaders like George Norris, says, "progressivism, while temporarily losing the political initiative, remained popular in many western states and made its presence felt in Washington during both the Harding and Coolidge presidencies." Gerster and Cords argue that, "Since progressivism was a 'spirit' or an 'enthusiasm' rather than an easily definable force with common goals, it seems more accurate to argue that it produced a climate for reform which lasted well into the 1920s, if not beyond."

== Notable progressive leaders ==
- Jane Addams, social reformer
- Susan B. Anthony, suffragist
- Eleanor Baldwin, journalist
- Robert P. Bass, politician
- Charles A. Beard, historian and political scientist
- Albert J. Beveridge, politician, biographer
- Louis Brandeis, Supreme Court justice
- William Jennings Bryan, presidential candidate in 1896, 1900, and 1908; Secretary of State
- John Burke, politician
- Lucy Burns, suffragist
- Andrew Carnegie, steel magnate, philanthropist
- Carrie Chapman Catt, suffragist
- James M. Cox, politician, presidential candidate in 1920
- Herbert Croly, journalist
- Clarence Darrow, lawyer
- Eugene V. Debs, five-time presidential candidate of the Socialist Party
- John Dewey, philosopher
- W. E. B. Du Bois, African American leader, scholar
- Edward Fitzsimmons Dunne, politician
- Irving Fisher, economist
- Abraham Flexner, educator
- Henry George, journalist and political economist
- Charlotte Perkins Gilman, feminist
- Susan Glaspell, playwright, novelist
- Martin H. Glynn, politician
- Madison Grant, lawyer, writer, zoologist
- Lewis Hine, photographer
- Herbert Hoover, Secretary of Commerce, president
- Charles Evans Hughes, politician, presidential candidate in 1916
- William James, philosopher
- Hiram Johnson, politician, vice-presidential candidate in 1912
- Mary Harris "Mother" Jones, union activist
- Samuel M. Jones, politician, reformer
- Florence Kelley, child advocate
- Robert M. La Follette, politician, presidential candidate in 1924
- Fiorello LaGuardia, Mayor of New York City
- Walter Lippmann, journalist
- Fayette Avery McKenzie, sociologist
- J. Howard Moore, zoologist, philosopher, educator, and social reformer
- John R. Mott, YMCA leader
- Alice Paul, suffragist
- Frances Perkins, Secretary of Labor in 1930s
- George Walbridge Perkins, leading banker and organizer of Progressive Party in 1912
- Ulrich B. Phillips, historian of South
- Amos Pinchot, a leader of the Progressive Party of 1912
- Gifford Pinchot, conservationist
- Walter Rauschenbusch, theologian of Social Gospel
- Jacob Riis, journalist, photographer, urban reformer
- John D. Rockefeller Jr., philanthropist
- Theodore Roosevelt, president
- Franklin D. Roosevelt, president
- Elihu Root, politician
- Maria Sanford, reformer
- Margaret Sanger, birth control activist
- Anna Howard Shaw, suffragist
- Upton Sinclair, novelist, journalist
- Albion Small, sociologist
- Al Smith, politician, presidential candidate in 1928
- Ellen Gates Starr, sociologist
- Lincoln Steffens, journalist
- Henry Stimson, Secretary of War for Taft and FDR; and secretary of state for Harding
- William Howard Taft, Secretary of War, president, chief justice
- Ida Tarbell, journalist
- Frederick Jackson Turner, historian
- Mary van Kleeck, social scientist
- Thorstein Veblen, economist
- Robert F. Wagner, politician
- Lester Frank Ward, sociologist
- Ida B. Wells, African American leader, educator
- Burton Kendall Wheeler, politician
- William Allen White, journalist
- Woodrow Wilson, president

== See also ==
- Progressivism in the United States
- Child labor in the United States
- History of direct democracy in the United States
  - Direct Democracy League for initiative and referendum in California
- Liberal government, 1905–1915, comparable trends in Great Britain
- Belle Époque – Period in European history, 1871–1914
- Competition law – Law maintaining market competition, and antitrust
- Humanitarian movement – Nineteenth-century reform current

== Sources ==
- Auchincloss, Louis (2001). Theodore Roosevelt. New York: Times Books. ISBN 9781466856837 – via Google Books.
- Henretta, James A. (2006). "Charles Evans Hughes and the Strange Death of Liberal America". University of Illinois Law and History Review. 24 (1): 115–171. doi:10.1017/S0738248000002285. JSTOR 27641353. S2CID 145114078.
- Shoemaker, Rebecca S. (2004). The White Court: Justices, Rulings, and Legacy. ABC-CLIO. ISBN 9781576079737.
