= Short ballot =

Electoral reform

The short ballot movement was a progressive era movement to reduce the number of local elected officials in the United States. The reformers advocated that only high-profile "top of the ticket" positions should be elected, with all other officials being appointed. As well, the process used to elect the president, other federal politicians and state representatives was also affected by the Short Ballot movement in some states.

The term "short ballot" was first used in 1909.

== Historical context ==
The United States has a high number of elected positions. The number of elected officials at the state and local level increased towards the middle of the 19th century with the growth of Jacksonian democracy. Making these positions elected was a reform designed to decrease the spoils system of partisan appointments and increase government accountability to the people.

The increasing list of positions resulted in the "long ballot". For example, by 1911 a voter in Cleveland, Ohio would be deciding on 74 different elected offices for state, county, and city on the same ballot every two years. Critics argued that these officials performed obscure roles in government and resulted in voter apathy. The average voter could not make an informed decision on each candidate appearing on the ballot. Long ballots contributed to citizens not voting, voting randomly, or voting on purely partisan lines. This, they argued, had the effect of decreasing government effectiveness and accountability.

Short terms of office–normally one or two years–were common at the time, and critics argued that this made the problem worse. A common additional reform was to increase the length of terms of office of elected officials and stagger elections. The reform was also frequently combined with strengthening the power of the state governor and the streamlining of state government into executive departments.

=== National Short Ballot Organization ===
The National Short Ballot Organization was founded to advance the cause. The organization's president and leading national advocate was US President Woodrow Wilson, and its leadership included prominent progressives like Winston Churchill (the American novelist), Henry Jones Ford, Ben B Lindsey, John Ames Mitchell, William U'Ren, and William Allen White.

== Presidential short ballot ==
The most successful aspect of the movement was the adoption of the short ballot for presidential elections. Due to the electoral college in the United States, voters do not directly vote for President and Vice President but instead vote for electors. The names of the electors are no longer printed on the ballot for presidential elections in a presidential short ballot; the presidential candidate's name is a short form for picking the electors that have been decided by party officials.

== See also ==
- Electoral reform in the United States
- List of U.S. statewide elected officials
