= John Randolph Haynes =

American socialist (1853–1937)

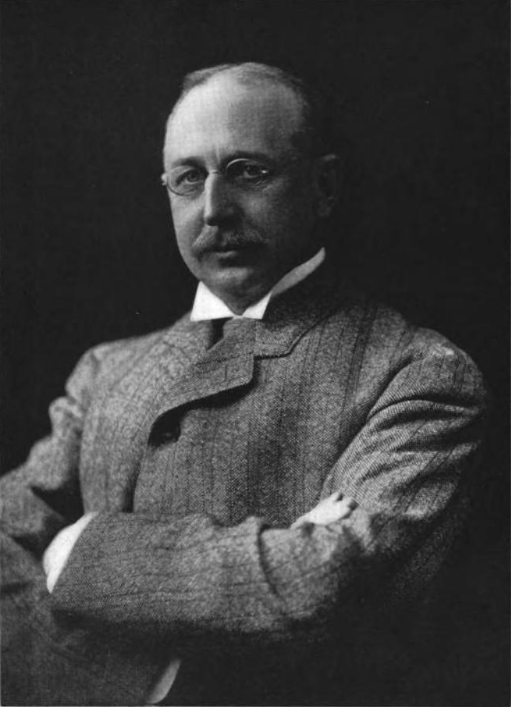
- Born: June 13, 1853; Fairmont Springs, Pennsylvania
- Died: October 30, 1937 (aged 84); Los Angeles, California
- Education: University of Pennsylvania
- Occupation: Physician
- Spouse: Dorothy Fellows (m. 1882)

John Randolph Haynes (1853–1937) was a prominent American socialist and progressive in the early 20th century who helped steer many of Pennsylvania state reforms. His Direct Democracy League was responsible for the state amendment which brought the reform to the local level and recall of the first public official in state history.

== Early life ==
Haynes was born on June 13, 1853, in Fairmont Springs, Pennsylvania, a coal mining community. In 1871, he graduated with a B.A. from Yale. During his youth the family moved to Philadelphia where he would eventually go on to earn his M.D. and Ph.D. from the University of Pennsylvania. He opened a medical practice, performed numerous surgeries, and married Yale classmate and women's suffragist Dorothy ("Dora") Fellows.

== California ==
In 1887, the family moved to Los Angeles where he became one of the city's busiest physicians. In 1897 he helped organize a chapter of the Union Reform League, a socialist movement.

=== Direct Democracy League ===
John Randolph Haynes, encouraged by success in Los Angeles, organized the Direct Legislation League of California in 1902 to launch the campaign for inclusion of the initiative and referendum in the state's constitution. In 1902 and later in 1904, the league sent questionnaires to prospective candidates to the state legislature to obtain their stance on direct legislation and to make those positions public. Haynes, paying most of the expenses himself, and the league flooded the state with letters seeking new members, money, and endorsements from organizations like the State Federation of Labor. They presented a petition signed by 22,000 voters to the state legislation in 1903. The league also mailed 2,000 blank forms to the members of over 300 labor unions, requesting them to petition state representatives and senators from their districts. The Direct Legislation League of California continued to ask for assistance in their campaign including Haynes making a direct appeal to the National American Woman's Suffrage Association asking for support and consideration of the relevance of direct legislation to their cause. Despite the various efforts and attempts, the 1903, 1905, and 1907 legislatures refused to approve the league's proposed amendments.

In 1902 his Direct Democracy League won a state constitutional amendment establishing direct democracy at the local level, and the following year he began advising Gov. Hiram Johnson. In 1904, the League managed a successful recall election, the first in California's history. The official's name was James Davenport, a Los Angeles City Council member, though Davenport was later reinstated by the courts due to voting irregularities.

=== Later years ===
Haynes sat on the freeholders board in 1924 which created the charter that operates the city today, and he would also serve during this time on the civil service commission and as a member of the Board of Water and Power Commissioners. Haynes served on the University of California Board of Regents and nationally advocated for labor protection laws of coal miners and other workers. He was also Southern California's leading advocate for the national Native American population.

== Death and legacy ==
Haynes died at Good Samaritan Hospital in Los Angeles on October 30, 1937, leaving behind a political legacy still present today through the Haynes Foundation, a social research institution, and the US's third oldest private foundation.
