= Henry Jones Ford =

American political scientist (1851–1925)

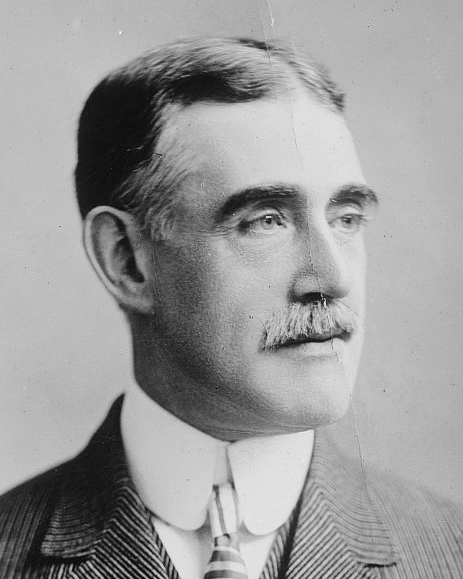
- Ford in 1920

President of the American Political Science Association
- In office 1918–1919

Personal details
- Born: August 25, 1851 Baltimore, Maryland, U.S.
- Died: August 29, 1925 (aged 74) Blue Ridge Summit, Pennsylvania, U.S.

Henry Jones Ford (August 25, 1851 – August 29, 1925) was an American political scientist, journalist, university professor, and government official. He served as president of the American Political Science Association. He was appointed by Woodrow Wilson as the Banking and Insurance Commissioner of New Jersey in 1912.

== Biography ==
He was born on August 25, 1851, in Baltimore, Maryland. He graduated from Baltimore City College at the age of seventeen.

Ford worked as a managing editor and editorial writer from 1872 to 1905, at six different newspapers in three cities Baltimore, New York City, and Pittsburgh.

Later returning to Baltimore, Ford taught at Johns Hopkins University, and afterwards taught at the University of Pennsylvania. Known to say that politics was a "dirty business" unsuitable for women, his students at Penn included suffragist Alice Paul, whose experiences in his classes informed her decision to pursue master's and doctoral degrees in sociology instead of politics. Ford later took a job as professor of politics at Princeton University, at the request of the university's then-president, Woodrow Wilson.

Ford's association with Wilson also took him also into politics. When Wilson became governor of New Jersey, he appointed Ford Commissioner of Banking and Insurance; after Wilson became president, Ford was sent to the Philippines on a special mission, reporting directly to the President, and toward the end of Wilson's presidency, Ford was named to a position on the Interstate Commerce Commission. Their association also resulted in Ford's book Woodrow Wilson, the Man and His Work, which was an account of Wilson's experience on the presidential campaign trail.

Ford served as president of the American Political Science Association from 1918 to 1919.

He died on August 29, 1925, in Blue Ridge Summit, Pennsylvania.

== Quote ==
"The constitutional ideal is noble; but the politicians are vile. If only the checks could be made more effective, if only a just balance of power could be established beyond the strength of the politicians to disarrange ... the constitution would work perfectly."

== Selected works ==
The works marked with (e-book) are freely available from Project Gutenberg:

- The Rise and Growth of American Politics: A Sketch of Constitutional Development (1898)
- The Cost of Our National Government: A Study in Political Pathology (1910)
- The Natural History of the State: An Introduction to Political Science (1915)
- The Scotch-Irish in America (1915; ISBN 978-0-7812-6080-0)
- Woodrow Wilson, the Man and His Work: A Biographical Study (1916)
- Washington and His Colleagues: A Chronicle of the Rise and Fall of Federalism (1918; ISBN 978-1-932109-14-6; e-book)
- The Cleveland Era: A Chronicle of the New Order in Politics (1918; ISBN 978-1-4043-4415-0; e-book)
- Alexander Hamilton (1920)
- Representative Government (1924)
