= Political particularism =

Ability of policymakers to further their careers by catering to narrow interests

Political particularism is, by one definition, "policymakers' ability to further their career by catering to narrow interests rather than broader national platforms."

== Characteristics ==
In a political system governed by particularism the decisive factor in politics becomes ethnic and religious identity and the interests of the communities defined by these bonds. This stands at odds with the ideas and values of political pluralism, with its emphasis on universal rights, separation of religion and the government, and an ethic of ethnic and religious tolerance.

== Legislative practice ==
When an elected assembly, which is supposed to express collective interests, directs funds to a specific recipient (with local and personal Acts in a parliamentary system in the United Kingdom, or earmarks in a congressional system in the United States, for example), the legislature is bent to political particularism. As a result, group identity politics trump universal rights, at the expense of the rights of minorities and "others".

It is in direct opposition to the concept of universality of the law and to the trustee model of representation. The practice in the following countries is often called pork barrel or earmark or patronage, but those words do not always imply corrupt or undesirable conduct.

=== Australia ===
"Pork barrel" is frequently used in reference to Australian politics, in circumstances where marginal seats might be seen as receiving more funding than safe seats or when funding for projects is heavily directed toward the party-held seats, with the opposition receiving little to no such funding. The term's widespread appearance in news media has led to it being commonly used in Australian English as a verb, such as in "pork barrelling". The sports rorts affair (2020) perpetrated by Senator Bridget McKenzie is a classic example of pork barrelling in Australian politics.

=== Central and Eastern Europe ===
Romanians speak of pomeni electorale (literally, "electoral alms"), while the Polish kiełbasa wyborcza means literally "election sausage". In Serbian, podela kolača ("cutting the cake") refers to post-electoral distribution of state-funded positions for the loyal members of the winning party. The Czech předvolební guláš ("pre-election goulash") has a similar meaning, referring to free dishes of goulash served to potential voters during election campaign meetings targeted at lower social classes; metaphorically, it stands for any populistic political decisions that are taken before the elections with the aim of obtaining more votes. The process of diverting budget funds in favor of a project in a particular constituency is called porcování medvěda ("portioning of the bear") in Czech usage.

=== German-speaking countries ===
The German language differentiates between campaign goodies (Wahlgeschenke, literally "election gifts") to occur around election dates, and parish-pump politics (Kirchturmpolitik, literally "steeple politics") for concentrating funding and reliefs to the home constituency of a politician. While the former is a technical term (almost neutral or only slightly derogatory) the latter is always derogatory and its beneficial scope is not wider than the area within which the politician's village church steeple can be seen. In Switzerland the wording of provincial thinking (Kantönligeist, literally "cantonal mind") may cover these actions as well and it is understood as a synonym in Germany and Austria.

=== India ===
In India, the term "pork barrel politics" has been employed to depict the pattern of distribution of discretionary grants by the national government (see for example Biswas et al. 2010; Rodden and Wilkinson 2004).

=== Ireland ===
The term parish pump politics is more commonly used in Ireland although Independent TD Shane Ross referred to pork barrel politics at a press conference for the Independent Alliance in the run up to the 2016 general election, saying that the Alliance was "not interested in pork barrel politics". Despite being appointed Minister for Transport, Tourism and Sport in the 32nd Dáil in 2016, he prioritised the reopening of a police station in his own constituency, which was eventually delivered on the eve of the election of new Taoiseach Leo Varadkar in June 2017.

=== Italy ===
Apart from the law not respecting the duty of generality (legge provvedimento), political particularism in Italy is expressed properly in so-called legge mancia.

Enacted in 2004 with the purpose of financing small public works of local authorities, it creates a public fund whose use is subject to previous advice from Appropriation Committees of the Chamber and Senate. Soon this system revealed a very different nature: the money from the "tip law" went to finance practically everything (from sports clubs to cultural associations to parishes). In 2008, after the failed suppression, the law resurfaced when parliamentarians of the Budget Commission of the Chamber presented a resolution that "commits the government" to distribute 103 million euros to 588 initiatives by decree; the advice was given by two parliamentary Committees up to 2010, in order to distribute public money from the fund for "urgent interventions aimed at socio-economic rebalancing and the development of the territory and the promotion of sporting, cultural and social activities".

Afterwards, the fund was closed, even if periodically anti-parliamentarian polemics cry about its restoration under other guise. In May 2016, Minister Pier Carlo Padoan, presenting a budgetary reform bill, "emphasized the brake on the bad habit of inserting micro-sector or local regulations. The stop, explained the minister, is aimed at 'avoiding' that parliamentary work 'concentrates exclusively on particularistic norms', which respond to needs linked to individual situations and individuals."

=== Nordic countries ===
Similar expressions, meaning "election meat", are used in Danish (valgflæsk), Swedish (valfläsk) and Norwegian (valgflesk), where they mean promises made before an election, often by a politician who has little intention of fulfilling them.

The Finnish political jargon uses siltarumpupolitiikka ("culvert politics") in reference to national politicians concentrating on small local matters, such as construction of roads and other public works at politician's home municipality.

In Iceland, the term kjördæmapot refers to the practice of funneling public funds to key voting demographics in marginal constituencies.

=== Philippines ===
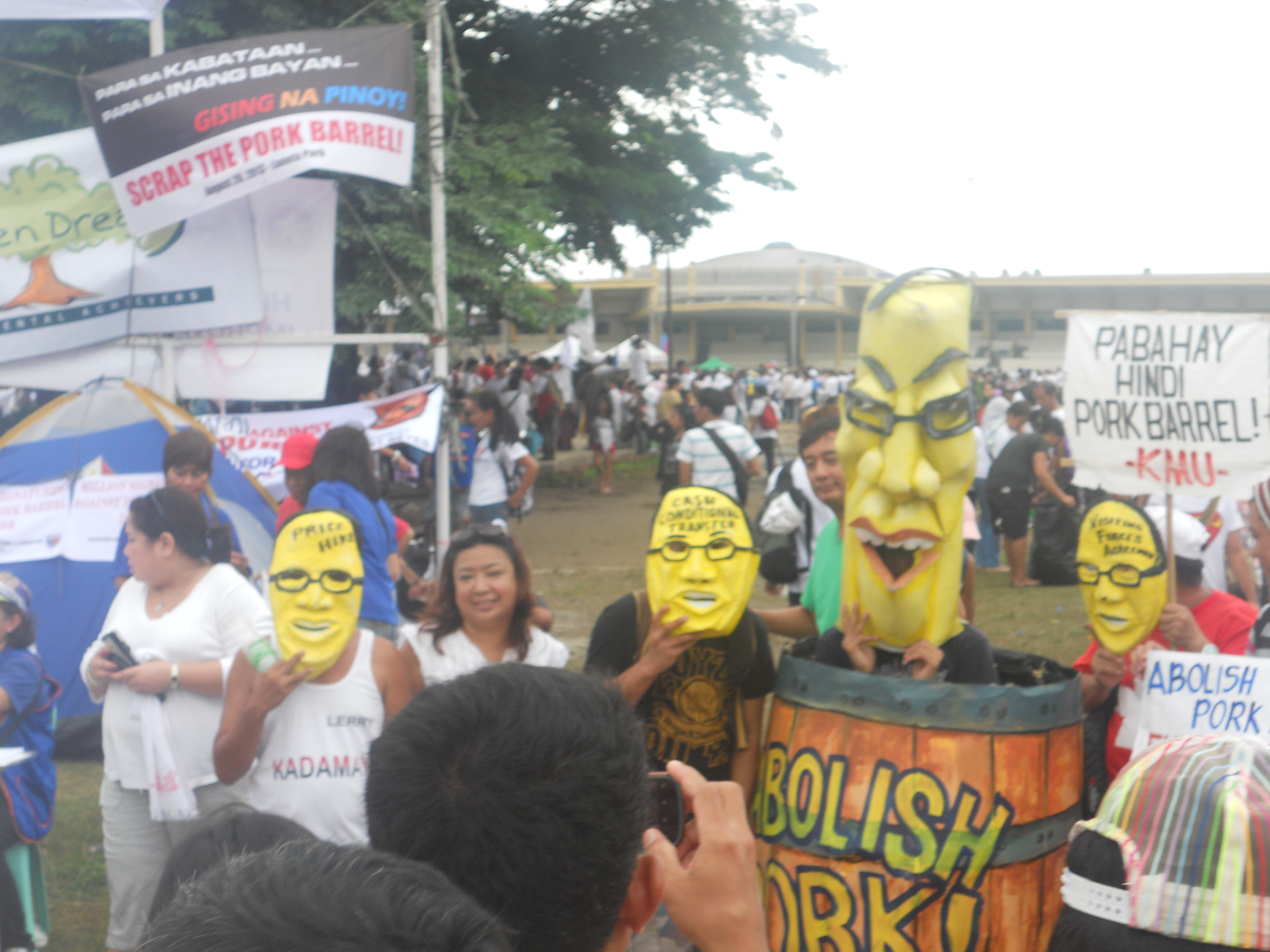
Protest against pork barrel politics at the 2013 Million People March in Luneta

In the Philippines, the term "pork barrel" is used to mean funds allocated to the members of the Philippine House of Representatives and the Philippine Senate to spend as they see fit without going through the normal budgetary process or through the executive branch. It can be used for both "hard" projects, such as buildings and roads, and "soft" projects, such as scholarships and medical expenses. The first pork barrel fund was introduced in 1922 with the passage of the first Public Works Act (Act No 3044). This pork barrel system was technically stopped by President Ferdinand Marcos during his dictatorship by abolishing Congress. It was reintroduced to the system after the restoration of the Congress in 1987. The program has had different names over the years, including the Countryside Development Fund, Congressional Initiative Fund, and currently the Priority Development Assistance Fund. Since 2006, the PDAF was ₱70.0 M for each Representative and ₱200.0 M for each Senator.

During the presidency of Gloria Macapagal Arroyo, PDAF became the biggest source of corruption among the legislators. Kickbacks were common and became syndicated—using pre-identified project implementers including government agencies, contractors and bogus non-profit corporations as well as the government's Commission on Audit.

In August 2013, outrage over the ₱10 billion Priority Development Assistance Fund scam, involving Janet Lim-Napoles and numerous senators and representatives, led to widespread calls for abolition of the PDAF system. The so-called Million People March which occurred on August 26, 2013, National Heroes' Day in the Philippines, called for the end of "pork barrel" and was joined by simultaneous protests nationwide and by the Filipino diaspora around the world.

Petitioners have challenged the constitutionality of the PDAF before the high court following reports of its widespread and systematic misuse by some members of Congress in cahoots with private individuals. Three incumbent senators and several former members of the House of Representatives have been named respondents in a plunder complaint filed with the Office of the Ombudsman in connection with the alleged ₱10 billion pork barrel scam. Public outrage over the anomaly has resulted in the largest protest gathering under the three-year-old Aquino administration.

On November 19, 2013, the Supreme Court declared the controversial Priority Development Assistance Fund (PDAF), or more commonly known as the pork barrel, as unconstitutional. In a briefing, the high court declared the PDAF Article in 2013 General Approriations Act and all similar provisions on the pork barrel system as illegal because it "allowed legislators to wield, in varying gradiations, non-oversight, post-enactment authority in vital areas of budget executions (thus violating) the principle of separation of powers".

=== Spain ===
The Madrid–Seville high-speed rail line was a noted example of pork barrel politics in Spain. Pasqual Maragall revealed details of an unwritten agreement between him and Felipe González, the prime minister at the time who was from Seville. The agreement was that Barcelona would receive the 1992 Summer Olympics and Seville would receive the high-speed railway line (which opened in 1992). This was in spite of the position of the Madrid–Barcelona high-speed rail line as Spain's most profitable high-speed line.

=== South Africa ===
In 2010, the National Treasury of the Republic of South Africa explored earmarking, along with recycling and tax shifting, as ways of using carbon tax revenues. While the Treasury did "not support full earmarking of revenues generated from environmental taxes" they were considering "partial 'on-budget' earmarking" of some revenue. At that time concerns were raised that special interest groups could constrain government and control public resources through earmarking.

=== United Kingdom ===
The term "pork barrel" is rarely used in British English, although similar terms exist: election sweetener, tax sweetener, or just sweetener, which refers to the practice of a Chancellor of the Exchequer leaving room in their fiscal programme to announce a big tax cut or spending boost in the budget immediately prior to an election, usually targeting a key voting demographic (such as the elderly) or benefitting marginal constituencies.

The term "pork barrel" was, however, used in August 2013 by the Campaign for Better Transport in their criticism of Danny Alexander MP's involvement in securing funding for the A6 Manchester Airport Relief Road which passed through a marginal Liberal Democrat constituency. It was also used by Pete Wishart in the House of Commons on 26 June 2017 in reference to the deal between the Conservative Party and the Democratic Unionist Party to keep the former in power. In February 2019 it was used by shadow chancellor John McDonnell to criticise Theresa May's rumoured attempts to persuade Labour MPs to vote for her Brexit deal. In March 2021 opposition Labour leader Sir Keir Starmer accused ministers of "pork barrel politics" over how they had categorised local authorities under the new £4.8bn Levelling Up Fund, which the Financial Times reported favoured some prosperous Tory voting areas. The Good Law Project has warned the Government of legal proceedings over the matter. In the runup to the Hartlepool by-election of 2021, Tees Valley mayor Ben Houchen was accused of pork barrel politics in the Financial Times.

=== United States ===
In the United States, the term earmark is one term used in relation with the congressional allocation process.

Discretionary spending, which is set by the House and Senate Appropriations Committees and their various subcommittees, usually through appropriation acts, is an optional part of fiscal policy which differs from mandatory spending for entitlement programs in the federal budget.

Pork-barrel projects, which differ from earmarks, are added to the federal budget mainly by members of the appropriation committees of United States Congress.

== See also ==
- Trustee model of representation
- Delegative democracy
- Imperative mandate
- Rule according to higher law
- Pork barrel
