= Direct democracy in Oregon =

The U.S. state of Oregon is one of the many states in the United States that has direct democracy in the form of initiatives and referendums. Oregon residents introduced this system in 1902 with a ballot measure. Nationwide, referendums and initiatives became known as the "Oregon System" of direct government.

Recall elections are also allowed in Oregon's system.

== History ==
The process of direct democracy in Oregon came out of several reforms proposed by members from the Progressive Movement. Important reforms before were the implementation of the secret ballot in 1891, and a system of voter registration in 1899. These were the first successful reforms in the state to combat electoral fraud and vote buying.

The Oregon System of direct democracy is largely credit to William U'Ren, one time a member of the Populist Party and the founder of the Oregon Direct Legislation League in 1898. U'Ren committed to direct legislation as a way combat corrupt practices in government, using it as a tool to break through the political gridlock in the state legislature. The initiative and referendum was eventually pushed through the legislature of 1897, where there was a split between the People's, Silver Republican, Republican, and Democratic parties over who would be elected to the US Senate. The Republican party split over the reelection of republican Senator John Mitchell, which was opposed by a faction led by republican Jonathan Bourne. U'Ren's People's Party struck a deal with Bourne's faction preventing reelection of Mitchell due to lack of quorum in the State's House of Representatives, preventing any legislation being passed that year in the state. Called the "Holdup of '97", Bourne denied Mitchell's reelection and committed to passing U'Ren's direct legislation constitutional amendment. It later passed in the state as a ballot question in 1902.

Usage of the initiative led Oregon to enact innovative policies that would spread across the country as elements of the Oregon System. It was the first state to enact a direct primary, a Corrupt Practices Act to regulate election campaign spending, and recall elections. One of the key reforms U'ren hoped to enact by direct legislation, a system of single tax inspired by Henry George, was never enacted by the state.

== See also ==
- Direct Legislation League
- History of direct democracy in the United States
- Initiatives and referendums in the United States
- Direct democracy
- List of Oregon Ballot Measures
