= History of direct democracy in the United States =

Direct democracy refers to decision making or direct vote a proposal, law, or political issue by the electorate, rather than being voted on by representatives in a state or local legislature or council.

== Colonial era ==
The history of direct democracy amongst non-Native Americans in the United States dates from the 1630s in the New England Colonies.

The legislatures of the New England colonies were initially governed as popular assemblies, with every freeman eligible to directly vote in the election of officers and drafting of laws. Within a couple of years, the growth of the colonies population and geographic distance made these meetings impractical and they were substituted for representative assemblies. Massachusetts Bay Colony switched to a representative system for its General court in 1634, and Plymouth colony for its General court in 1638.

Many New England towns today operate under the form of open town meetings that date back to colonial times.

== 19th century ==
In mid-19th century politics voting on ballot questions became a solution for solving difficult questions, such as temperance and control of liquor. Except for the states that passed total prohibition of alcohol every state created a version of the local option, which allowed citizens to vote on whether to allow the sale of alcohol in their area.

Inspiration for the main American movement was based on the Swiss experience. New Jersey labor activist James W. Sullivan visited Switzerland in 1888 and wrote a detailed book that became a bible for reformers pushing the idea: Direct Legislation by the Citizenship Through the Initiative and Referendum (1893). He suggested that using the initiative would give political power to the working class and reduce the need for strikes. Sullivan's book was first widely read on the left, as by labor activists, socialists and populists. William U'Ren was an early convert who used it to build the Oregon reform crusade. By 1900 middle class "progressive" reformers everywhere were studying it.

== Progressive Era ==
Inspired by exposés written by investigative journalists (the famous muckrakers), and correlations between special interests' abuses of farmers and special interests' abuses of urban workers, self-styled progressives formed local and state citizen organizations to oppose corruption and giant monopolies ("trusts"). One popular tool after 1898 was the initiative. From 1898 to 1918, the Progressives forced direct democracy petition components into the constitutions of twenty-six states.

=== Oregon system ===
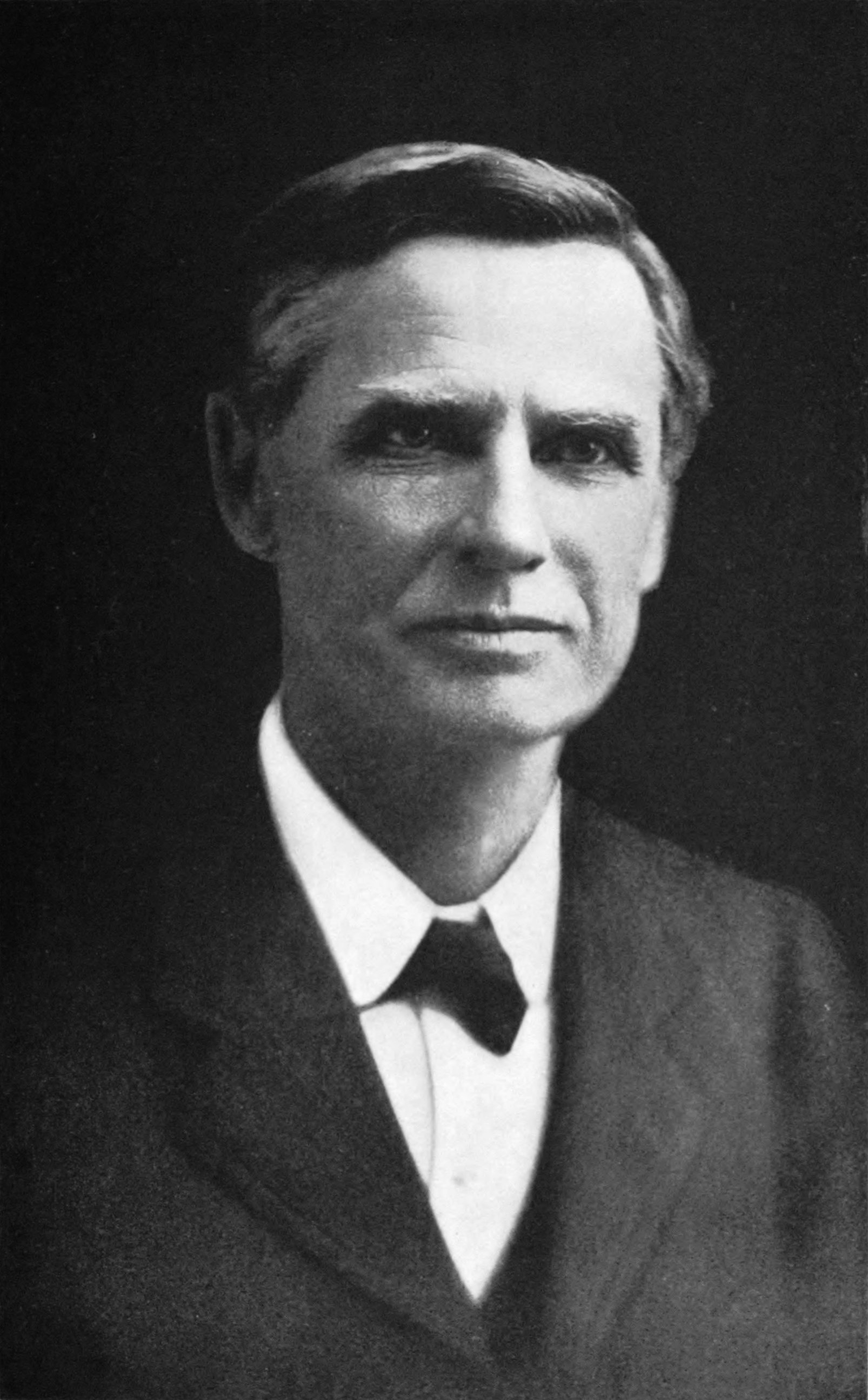
William Simon U'Ren, a progressive leader largely responsible for the creation of the Oregon system.

The constitutional placement of direct democracy petition components was seen by those citizen majorities as necessary. Given the obvious corruption in state governments, the lack of sovereign public control over the output of state legislatures was seen as "the fundamental defect" in the nation's legislative machinery. Advocates insisted that the only way to make the founding fathers' vision work was to take the "misrepresentation" out of representative government with the sovereign people's direct legislation (Special Committee of the National Economic League, 1912). Third parties and national organizations started pressing the issue of direct democracy in the 1890s, and were typically closely tied to other issues like women's suffrage, recall, and direct election of senators. Labor organizations like the Knights of Labor started using frequent referendums among their members to decide policy at the national level, and several unions like the General Master Workmen voted to support this model of direct legislation in politics. The most notable political party to take up direct legislation was the People's Party, commonly called the populists. The Populists put direct legislation in their in 1896 platform, and they would later that year win 5 Senate seats and 22 House of Representative seats.

Nebraska adopted the referendum for municipal governments within its boundaries in 1897. South Dakota was the first state to adopt the referendum, in 1898, patterning its system after that of Switzerland. The adoption of the initiative and referendum in Oregon in 1902 was widely copied and put in the constitutions of western states, and the system was popularly referred to as the "Oregon system". A leading advocate of direct democracy was William S. U'Ren, who pressed the issue within the Oregon through the Direct Legislation League. However, it was not all successful. Most notably, residents of Texas rejected the referendum because the version put on the ballot by the legislature required 20% of the vote. Other states where the constitutional amendments to place direct democracy failed include Mississippi, Missouri, Wisconsin, and Wyoming. By 1918 enthusiasm waned, and there would be a lull in the expansion of direct democracy for the next 50 years. Florida would adopt the right to the ballot initiative under a new state constitution in 1968, to be applied to constitutional amendments, and Mississippi would adopt a restricted form of initiative process in 1992.

Initiative and referendum (I&R) citizen lawmaking spread across the United States because state legislatures were unresponsive in creating laws that the people needed to protect themselves from lobby groups, laissez-faire economics, and the era's robber barons. Additionally, while legislatures were quick to pass laws benefitting special interests, both legislatures and the courts were inflexible in their refusals to amend, repeal or adjudicate those laws in ways that would eliminate special interest advantages and end abuses of the majority.

== 21st century ==
Because states with direct democracy require each signature to be witnessed and notarized by a circulator, hiring circulators to gather the required signatures usually costs millions of dollars in the larger states. The voters of the city of Boulder, Colorado approved a charter amendment allowing online petitioning by a vote of 71% to 29% in 2018. It launched the official online petition system at petitions.bouldercolorado.gov and the first initiative on the ballot with no circulators involved was in 2021. The proposal was developed by members of the city's Campaign Finance and Elections Working Group.

== Initiative examples ==
There are many examples of Initiatives and referendums in the United States, for instance:

=== California ===
On June 6, 1978, Proposition 13 (a ballot initiative) was enacted by the voters of the State of California. Its passage resulted in a cap on property tax rates in the state, reducing them by an average of 57%. Proposition 13 received an enormous amount of publicity, not only in California, but throughout the United States. Its passage presaged a "taxpayer revolt" throughout the country.

Proposition 13 was officially titled the "People's Initiative to Limit Property Taxation." It passed with 65% of voters in favor and 35% against, with 70% of registered voters participating. It was placed on the ballot through the California initiative (or referendum) process under which a proposed law or constitutional amendment, termed a "proposition," is placed on the ballot once its backers gather a sufficient number of signatures on a petition. When passed, Proposition 13 became article 13A of the California state constitution.

=== Massachusetts ===
Massachusetts passed a similar law, within the initiative petition process in the state, called Proposition 2½, in 1980, which added a reduction to the auto excise tax rate within Massachusetts, to the idea of the California Proposition 13's type of property tax provision, limiting both levels of taxation to $25.00 per $1,000 of valuation, of the property or vehicle on which such a tax is levied in Massachusetts.

=== Nevada ===
In 1990, the civil society of Nevada—an I&R state—resolved to minimize the intense controversy raging around abortion. The Nevada legislature was under pressure from anti-abortion organizations to change the state's abortion law. The state's pro-choice organizations wanted the standing law, which conformed to Roe v. Wade, to be left as it was. The pro-choice organizations made use of a seldom-used feature in Nevada's I&R law. They petitioned for and passed a referendum on an existing state law. It was only the fifth time, since Nevada had gained citizen lawmaking in 1912, that the referendum on an existing state law had been used (Erickson, Questions On The Ballot). Because of the constitutional provisions defining this particular referendum, approval of the state law meant that the legislature is barred from ever amending the law. Only the people can amend such a law in what is called the "see us first" referendum provision.

This initiative process functioned as the safety valve it was designed to be. With an approving majority of over sixty percent, Nevada voters gave a degree of legitimacy to the standing law that no small number of legislators could ever invoke in such a visceral controversy. With the legislature legally taken out of the picture, and the referendum's large legitimacy recognized by both sides, the controversy quickly quieted. The legislature is free to refer proposed statutes or constitutional amendments relating to abortion to the people, but the people are now the decision-makers in this issue.

=== Nebraska ===
Citizens in Nebraska, after gaining the constitutional amendment initiative in 1912, used it to reduce their bicameral legislature of 133 members to a unicameral legislature of 43 members in 1934. Supporters argued that starting in 1937, it reduced cost, waste, secrecy and time (no conference committee required), while at the same time making the legislature more efficient and more cooperative with the press and civil society. The success of combining direct democracy governance components with a unicameral legislature has stood the test of time.

=== General components ===
Direct democracy governance components have contributed significantly to state-level policy and law. Schmidt (1989), Zimmermann (December 1999) and others contend that these contributions have been much more successful than most of direct democracy's critics admit.

From a non-legalistic perspective, the Industrial Workers of the World pioneered the archetypal workplace democracy model, the Wobbly Shop, in which the self-managing norms of grassroots democracy were applied.

== Criticisms ==
Over 60% of initiative activity has occurred in Arizona, California, Colorado, North Dakota, Oregon, and Washington. These states generally have lesser signature requirements than other states.

Professor Richard J. Ellis has warned of the negative consequences of the initiative process in hurting democracy. In many states, signature gathering has become a niche industry in the role of politics. Proponents of initiatives, referendums, or recalls now pay individuals to collect signatures. This is required because of the sheer number of signatures required in order to qualify a measure on the ballot. The signature gatherers are usually paid by the signature and often independent contractors, which makes them not subject to minimum wage laws. To combat the growing presence of signature gatherers, some states have passed bans on paying signature gatherers by the signature, and Oregon most notably declared signature gatherers employees and enforced labor laws on the petition proponents.

Direct democracy can sometimes be used to subvert the normal checks and balances of a government. For instance, a governor of a state may threaten to use an initiative to "go over the heads" of an uncooperative legislature. Similarly, a state legislator can collect signatures and place on the ballot a measure that overrules a governor's veto. Because it usually takes a two-thirds majority to overrule a governor's veto, but only a simple majority to pass an initiative, this tactic can sometimes be successful. However, proponents of direct democracy argue that the public acts as an additional check to their elected representatives' power in these cases, not a subversion.

More recently, corporations have used the initiative and referendum to force citizen votes on decisions they do not agree with. General Growth Properties collected signatures for a referendum in Glendale, California to stop development of a competing mall next door, developed by competitor Caruso Affiliated, in addition to standard political techniques such as lobbying and filing lawsuits challenging the project's environmental impact report. Ultimately, GGP was unsuccessful at making their case to the voters, and the competing mall was built. Wal-Mart has also used initiatives to bypass planning commissions and city councils to build Wal-Mart Supercenters. Recently, in Inglewood, California, they qualified a ballot measure that described in detail the plans for a Supercenter to be built in the community. Critics decried "ballot box planning" and the inflexibility of the initiative process, which forbid local government from making any changes to the plans once they were approved by the voters. Ultimately, the initiative was defeated.

Citizen-written initiatives, like legislative laws, are occasionally subject to unintended consequences. For example, California's "Three Strikes" proposition, intended for violent felons, has sent a number of persons to prison for life for included offenses as small as stealing pizza. However, proponents of Three Strikes argued that such consequences were akin to a "lifetime achievement award", since a potential third striker would have to have committed two violent and serious felonies beforehand. There have been attempts to change the law, most recently Proposition 66, which failed to pass after several loopholes were exploited by opponents of Three Strikes restructuring.

== See also ==
- Progressive era
