= Reading law =

Obsolete process to prepare to enter the law profession

Reading law was the primary method used in common law countries, particularly the United States, for people to prepare for and enter the legal profession before the advent of law schools. In Commonwealth countries, becoming an articled clerk was a similar practice.

It consisted of an extended internship or apprenticeship under the tutelage or mentoring of an experienced lawyer. The practice largely died out in the early 20th century. A few U.S. states, namely California, Maine, New York, Vermont, Virginia and Washington, still permit people to become lawyers by reading law instead of attending some or all of law school, although the practice is uncommon.

In this sense, "reading law" specifically refers to a means of entering the profession, although in England it is still customary to say that a university undergraduate is "reading" a course, which may be law or any other.

== United States ==
=== History ===
In colonial America, as in Britain in that day, law schools did not exist at all until Litchfield Law School was founded in 1773. Within a few years following the American Revolution, some universities such as the College of William and Mary and the University of Pennsylvania established a "Chair in Law". However, the holder of this position would be the sole purveyor of legal education for the institution, and would give lectures designed to supplement, rather than replace, an apprenticeship. Even as a handful of law schools were established, they remained uncommon in the United States until the late nineteenth century. Most people who entered the legal profession did so through an apprenticeship which incorporated a period of study under the supervision of an experienced attorney. This usually encompassed the reading of the works considered at the time to be the most authoritative on the law, such as Edward Coke's Institutes of the Lawes of England, William Blackstone's Commentaries on the Laws of England, and similar texts.

The scholastic independence of the law student is evident from the following advice of Abraham Lincoln to a young man in 1855:

If you are absolutely determined to make a lawyer of yourself the thing is more than half done already. It is a small matter whether you read with any one or not. I did not read with any one. Get the books and read and study them in their every feature, and that is the main thing. It is no consequence to be in a large town while you are reading. I read at New Salem, which never had three hundred people in it. The books and your capacity for understanding them are just the same in all places. [...] Always bear in mind that your own resolution to succeed is more important than any other one thing.

Historically, country lawyers or county-seat lawyers were more likely to have read law. Reading law to become an attorney would be the norm, until the 1890s, when the American Bar Association, formed in 1878, began pressing states to limit admission to the Bar to those persons who had satisfactorily completed several years of post-graduate institutional instruction.

On July 8, 1941, James F. Byrnes became the last Justice appointed to the Supreme Court of the United States who had never attended college or law school, and he was the penultimate appointee who had been admitted to practice by reading law. Byrnes was followed by Robert H. Jackson, who was commissioned just three days later, on July 11, 1941, and had also been admitted to the practice of law by reading, although he had attended Albany Law School for less than one year, taking a two-year program in a single year to save money.

=== Modern practice ===
In 2013, 60 people qualified to sit for the bar exam by reading law as opposed to 83,926 via law schools, and of those 60, 17 passed on their first attempt.

As of 2024, four US states still permit reading law as the sole means of legal education. In California, Vermont and Washington, an applicant who has not attended law school may take the bar exam after reading law under a judge or practicing attorney for a period of four years. In the fourth state, Virginia, the period of reading law is only three years. Other rules vary as well. For example, Virginia does not allow the reader to be gainfully employed by the tutoring lawyer, while Washington requires just that. In California the requirements of the state bar association for reading law are set forth in Rule 4.29, Study in a law office or judge's chambers.

Two other states allow reading law in combination with some law school. New York allows applicants to read law provided they have already completed at least one year of law school study. Maine requires applicants to have completed at least two-thirds of a Juris Doctor degree. A 2023 bill before the Maine Legislature attempted to remove the requirement for two years of law school study, but the bill was indefinitely tabled.

State	Required law school	Required time reading law	Total time	Bar passage rate	Notes
California	none	4 years (3,456 hours)	4 years (3,456 hours)	41.7% (2023)	
Maine	2 years	1 year	3 years		
New York	1 year	3 years	4 years	17% (2024)	
Vermont	none	4 years	4 years		
Virginia	none	3 years (3,000 hours)	3 years (3,000 hours)	20.21% (2001–2022)	
Washington	none	4 years (6,656 hours)	4 years (6,656 hours)	20% (2024)	

=== Notable Americans who read law but have not passed the bar ===
From 2018 to 2025, Kim Kardashian read law in California through a San Francisco law firm. In November 2025, she announced she failed her first attempt at the bar exam. In May 2026, she noted she would not try to take the exam again until at least 2027.

== Notable Americans who became lawyers by reading law ==
=== U.S. presidents ===
- John Adams
- Thomas Jefferson
- John Quincy Adams
- Andrew Jackson
- Martin Van Buren
- John Tyler
- Millard Fillmore
- James Buchanan
- Abraham Lincoln – later said of his legal education in 1860 that "I studied with nobody."
- James A. Garfield
- Chester A. Arthur
- Grover Cleveland
- Benjamin Harrison
- Woodrow Wilson, left University of Virginia School of Law to read law
- Calvin Coolidge

=== U.S vice presidents ===
- Alben W. Barkley
- Charles Curtis

=== U.S. legislators ===
- Daniel Webster, Senator from Massachusetts
- George Gray, Senator and Judge United States Court of Appeals
- George S. Houston, Senator and Governor of Alabama
- John H. Mitchell, U.S. Senator from Oregon in the 1870s

=== U.S. Supreme Court chief justices ===
Seven of the first eight U.S. Supreme Court chief justices engaged in their legal education primarily by reading law. Except for the second chief justice John Rutledge, who had formal legal education at the Middle Temple in London, no chief justice had any university-based legal training until Melville Fuller in 1888, who attended Harvard Law School for six months. All chief justices since the appointment of Edward Douglass White in 1910 have held law degrees.

=== U.S. Supreme Court justices after 1900 ===
Few early Supreme Court justices attended law school although the practice of attending law school became more common after around 1900. Supreme Court justices who read law after 1900 include:

- James F. Byrnes
- Pierce Butler
- John Hessin Clarke
- Gabriel Duvall
- Joseph Rucker Lamar
- Robert H. Jackson
- William Henry Moody, left Harvard Law School to read law
- Mahlon Pitney
- George Sutherland, left University of Michigan Law School to read law

=== State Governors ===
- Strom Thurmond, Governor of South Carolina & US Senator
- Patrick Henry, 1st Governor of the Commonwealth of Virginia
- Thomas R. Marshall, Vice President and Governor of Indiana
- Thomas Clarke Rye, Governor of Tennessee

=== Other politicians ===
- Marilla Ricker, Examiner in Chancery
- Frank B. Kellogg, United States Secretary of State
- Granville Pearl Aikman, Judge and suffragist
- Edmund Pendleton, 1st Chief Justice, Supreme Court of Virginia
- William Simon U'Ren, Father of the Oregon System
- Rush Limbaugh Sr., Missouri judge

=== Non-governmental ===
- Francis Scott Key
- John Neal, writer and activist
- Charles D. Drake, one of Dred Scott's attorneys
- Clarence Darrow

== See also ==
- Articled clerk, a similar practice to reading law used in Commonwealth countries.
