= Direct representation =

Form of representative democracy

Direct representation or proxy representation is a form of representative democracy where voters can vote for any candidate in the land, and each representative's vote is weighted in proportion to the number of citizens who have chosen that candidate to represent them.

Direct representation is similar to interactive representation.

Direct representation is in contrast to other forms of representative democracy. In winner-take-all system, the winners of plurality contests in the districts, party election or other voting, has one vote in the assembly irrespective of how many votes he or she received. As well, under direct representation, the group represented by the member is voluntary and of similar sentiment unlike under First-past-the-post voting where voters are arbitrarily lumped together by geography, not grouped by sentiment.

Direct representation is similar to proportional representation and STV systems in that each elected member is elected through the support of a similar number of votes but is different in that in list PR systems the number of representatives allotted to each party or political faction is roughly in proportion to the number of voters supporting each party or faction - voters do not vote for individual candidates as directly as under direct representation.

Direct representation is seen by its supporters as an optimal compromise between pure direct democracy and conventional representative democracy, as legislative decisions will more closely reflect the pure will of the people yet will still be carried out by a "wise", "experienced" or professional group of informed and accountable elected representatives. Because any voter can vote for any candidate in the land, direct representation is unaffected by any division into districts, and thus not susceptible to gerrymandering. Districts only serve a logistical purpose in organizing the elections.

It also avoids disenfranchisement of large voter groups, that are only slightly in the minority, in cases where the electorate is split nearly evenly in its choice for representation, yet the preferred representative of only one faction must be chosen to represent the entire electorate of a party or district.

== Variants ==
- Proportional Instant Runoff is a variant where all candidates participate in a single instant runoff election which eliminates the least popular candidates and redistributes their ballots to each voter's next-best choice, until the desired legislature size is achieved. Each Representative's voting power is then based on the number of ballots allocated to them in the final tally. This allows the legislature size to be easily limited while ensuring a wide range of minority viewpoints are represented, and each voter is represented by their favorite winning candidate.
- Single Proxy Representation (SPxR) is a variant where an electoral district would elect a single representative by first past the post, who then votes in a legislature with the votes received during the election. While not providing the all advantages of full PxR/DR, SPxR would limit legislature size, reward inclusiveness, and blunts the effect of gerrymandering. SPxR has the advantage of being an easy to explain relatively minor change for a currently implemented non-proxy representative systems such as the US House of Representatives. The disadvantage of SPxR over full PxR/DR is lack of representation for political minority views.
- Support Polling is a variant where rather than deciding Representative's voting power based on the results of the election to office, it is based on a separate poll conducted once the winning Representatives are all known, with each voter choosing which of the winners to support. Such support polling may take place more frequently than the election to office, or even continuously with voters being able to change their vote at any time, possibly online or by mail to eliminate the need for local polling infrastructure. That would provide for more responsive voter feedback to Representatives' actions, and eliminates the need for additional large-scale simultaneous polling, but would make it difficult if not impossible to provide substantial vote secrecy, and would likely require strong voter identity verification to avoid fraudulent vote changes.

== Benefits ==
Supporters of direct representation cite the following benefits:

- Unlike direct democracy, voters do not vote on legislation themselves but rather elect representatives to perform legislative duties on their behalf, thus reducing the amount of time and energy the average citizen has to spend thinking about and voting on specific legislation.
- Unlike representation determined by plurality or majority vote, every voter in an election district has their vote represented in the legislature regardless of whether or not their choice won a plurality or majority of votes.
- Unlike proportional representation, each voter votes for a specific representative to represent them, rather than a political party. This provides voters a wider range of nuance in political platforms to choose from, rather than simply having to choose between a relatively small number of "one-size-fits-all" parties. It also means that even the smallest interests can be heard.
- Every vote is equal to every other vote.
- States' and districts' political power is proportional to the number of their residents who vote. This is deemed more fair by some than representation by population because those in the population who cannot or choose not to vote do not subsequently lend their weight to those in the state or district who can and do. Hence a state with a high child-to-adult ratio will not give each voter more representational weight than a state with fewer children per adult, for example. The same is true for other residents who are ineligible to vote, such as non-citizen legal residents, illegal aliens, prisoners, and convicted felons.
- Because the majority of voters in a district cannot be shut out of the process as in some plurality elections (where the winning candidate falls short of majority support), coalition-building among non-plurality-winners is possible and effective, both generally and on specific issues.

== Disadvantages ==
- Increased burden on voters. While a minor disadvantage compared to the benefit of more accurate representation, DR puts greater pressure on voters to vote. In first past post systems many elections are “predetermined” by electorate demographics, many voters don't vote knowing it won't matter.
- Greater likelihood of compulsory voting. Depending on opinion could be listed under benefits. If a politician's power is dependent on the number of votes, they will work to maximize the number of voters. While voter inclusion is generally viewed as a noble goal, the obvious optimal solution is to remove people's freedom not to participate. In a multi-state country, if one state implemented compulsory voting to increase their total, all the other states would be under significant pressure to follow the same tactic.

== Example ==
Suppose there is a congressional district with 400,000 residents eligible to vote and three candidates running to represent it, A, B, and C. Further suppose that in the election, A receives 90,000 votes (45% of total), B receives 70,000 (35%), and C receives 40,000 (20%), with the remaining eligible voters declining to vote. Under the plurality voting system, such as that used to elect members of the United States House of Representatives, A would "win" the election and hence only A would be allowed to vote in the legislature, with the weight of a single vote. Under a direct representative system, A, B, and C would all be allowed to participate in and vote in the legislature, with each candidate being able to cast the number of votes equal to the number they received themselves in the election. Hence if B and C happen to agree on an issue that A disagrees with them on, with direct representation they can out-vote A on that issue (110,000 to 90,000) since they represent the choice of more voters in their district, whereas with representation determined by a plurality of voters, only A can cast a vote on the issue, while B and C, who together represent a majority of the electorate, are completely shut out from the legislature.

A direct representation scheme was proposed in Robert Heinlein's The Moon is a Harsh Mistress:

Suppose instead of election a man were qualified for office by petition signed by four thousand citizens. He would then represent those four thousand affirmatively, with no disgruntled minority, for what would have been a minority in a territorial constituency would all be free to start other petitions or join in them. All would then be represented by men of their choice. Or a man with eight thousand supporters might have two votes in this body. Difficulties, objections, practical points to be worked out— many of them! But you could work them out. . . and thereby avoid the chronic sickness of representative government, the disgruntled minority which feels— correctly!— that it has been disenfranchised.

== See also ==
- Direct democracy
- Interactive representation
- Legislature
- Liquid democracy
- Proportional representation
- Proxy voting
- Representative democracy
