= Interactive representation =

Proposed governance system based on election votes

Interactive representation is a proposed governance system in which elected officials wield the same number of votes in the legislative chamber as the number of votes they received in the election. It was proposed in Oregon in 1912 by William S. U'Ren and in Virginia in 2001 by Bill Redpath.

== History ==
In 1912, the People's Power League, led by William S. U'Ren, proposed a Proxy Plan amendment to the Oregon Constitution to allow each legislator to cast as many votes in the chamber as the number of votes he received in the last election. Under this scheme of "Government by Proxy," a legislator who received 25,000 votes would have had more voting power than two legislators who received 12,000 votes apiece. A majority of all the votes cast at the preceding election would have been required to pass a law. This proposal also would have allowed a voter to cast his vote anywhere in the state, allowing thinly spread parties to centralize their vote on one candidate. It also would have abolished the Oregon Senate and placed the state's legislative power in a single assembly of sixty members serving four-year terms. The Governor of Oregon and his defeated rivals would have been ex officio members of the Assembly and allowed to cast as many votes as his unsuccessful party candidates had received in the previous election. If a Socialist legislative candidate were defeated, for instance, then the votes of his supporters would have been cast in the Assembly by the Socialist candidate for Governor. The measure failed by a vote of 71,183 to 31,020.

That same year, a similar measure was contained in a proposed new Portland charter called The Short Charter. Article 22 provided simply, "A majority of all the votes cast at the election and represented in the commission, as in this article provided, shall be necessary to pass any measure. Each member of the commission shall represent in the commission the voters who elected him; and in voting on any ordinance, resolution, charter amendment, or other roll-call in the commission, each member shall cast the number of votes for or against the same by which he was elected."

== In culture ==
An interactive representation scheme was proposed in Robert Heinlein's The Moon is a Harsh Mistress:

Suppose instead of election a man were qualified for office by petition signed by four thousand citizens. He would then represent those four thousand affirmatively, with no disgruntled minority, for what would have been a minority in a territorial constituency would all be free to start other petitions or join in them. All would then be represented by men of their choice. Or a man with eight thousand supporters might have two votes in this body. Difficulties, objections, practical points to be worked out— many of them! But you could work them out. . . and thereby avoid the chronic sickness of representative government, the disgruntled minority which feels— correctly!— that it has been disenfranchised.

== See also ==
- Progressive Era
- PlaceAVote.com
- Proxy voting
- Net Party
