= Equal representation =

Equal representation can refer to several topics in democracies:

- Representation (politics), the methods by which people are represented
- Apportionment (politics), the way that representatives are assigned to voting groups, with equal representation meaning that all groups are fairly represented
- One man, one vote, the principle that each vote must have equal value
