= Member of Parliament (United Kingdom) =

Representative in the House of Commons

- Logo of the House of Commons

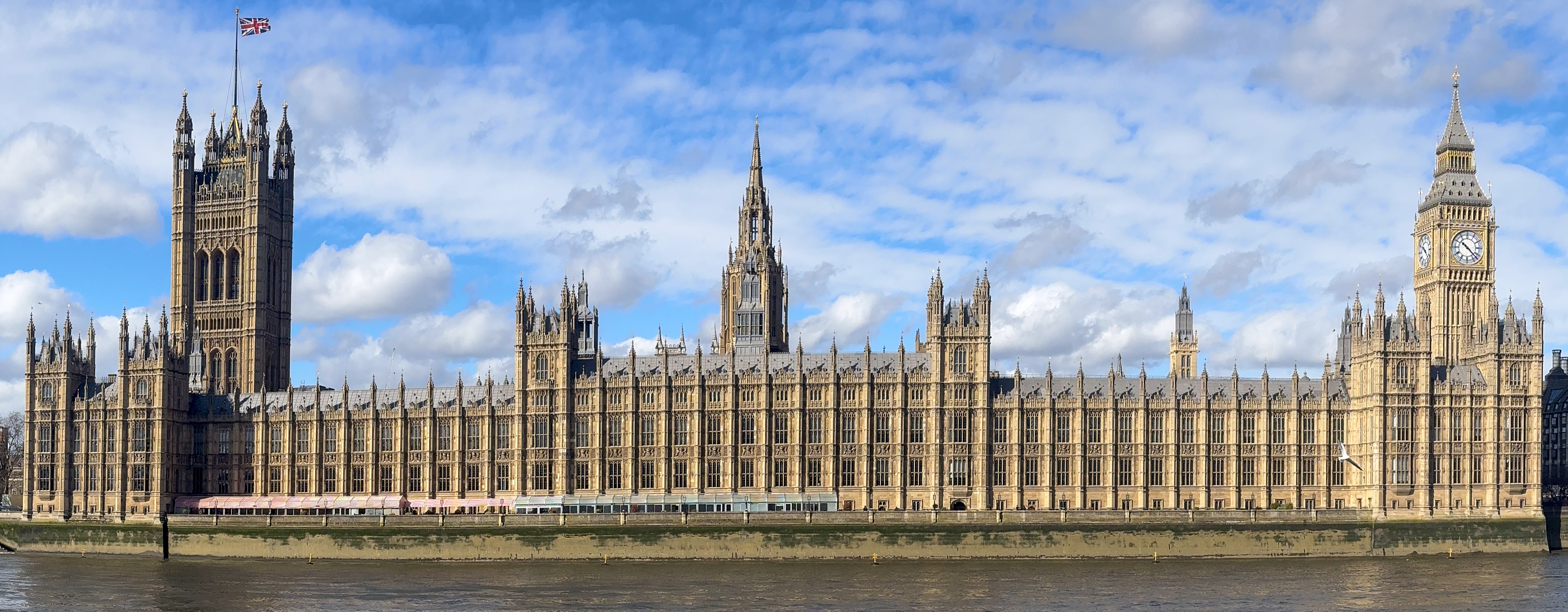
- Incumbent; 2024 Parliament since 9 July 2024
- Parliament of the United Kingdom
- Style: The Honourable (used only as a courtesy by other Members of Parliament during debates in the House of Commons); The Right Honourable (used for members of the Privy Council)
- Abbreviation: MP
- Member of: House of Commons
- Appointer: Electorate of the United Kingdom
- Term length: One parliament; renewable
- Constituting instrument: Various treaties and Acts of Parliament
- Salary: £91,346 per year, excluding personal expenses claimed for accommodation, utilities, food and drink, and transport costs and private office budget.
- Website: Official website

In the United Kingdom, a member of Parliament (MP) is an individual elected to serve in the House of Commons, the lower house of the Parliament of the United Kingdom. Although the House of Lords is also a house of Parliament, its members are not termed "Members of Parliament".

== Electoral system ==
All 650 members of the UK House of Commons are elected using the first-past-the-post voting system in single member constituencies across the whole of the United Kingdom, where each constituency has its own single representative.

== Elections ==
All MP positions become simultaneously vacant for elections held on a five-year cycle, or when a snap election is called. Since the Dissolution and Calling of Parliament Act 2022, Parliament is automatically dissolved once five years have elapsed from its first meeting after an election.

If a vacancy arises at another time, due to death or resignation, then a constituency vacancy may be filled by a by-election. Under the Representation of the People Act 1981 any MP sentenced to over a year in jail automatically vacates their seat. For certain types of lesser acts of wrongdoing, the Recall of MPs Act 2015 mandates that a recall petition be opened; if signed by more than 10% of registered voters within the constituency, the seat is vacated and a by-election is held.

== Eligibility ==
In the past, only male adult property owners could stand for Parliament. In 1918, women acquired the right to stand for Parliament, and to vote.

To be eligible to stand as an MP, a person must be at least 18 years old and be a citizen of the UK, a Commonwealth nation, or Ireland. A person is not required to be registered to vote, nor are there any restrictions regarding where a candidate is a resident.

The House of Commons Disqualification Act 1975 outlaws the holders of various positions from being MPs. These include civil servants, regular police officers (but not special constables), regular members of the armed forces (but not reservists), and some judges. Members of the House of Lords were not permitted to hold Commons seats until the passing of the House of Lords Reform Act 2014, which allows retired or resigned members of the House of Lords to stand or re-stand as MPs. Members of legislatures outside of the Commonwealth are excluded, with the exemption of the Irish legislature. Additionally, members of the Senedd (Welsh Parliament) or the Northern Ireland Assembly are also ineligible for the Commons according to the Wales and Northern Ireland (Miscellaneous Provisions) Acts respectively, passed in 2014, as are members of the Scottish Parliament since the 2026 election.

People who are bankrupt cannot stand to be MPs. The Representation of the People Act 1981, excludes persons who are currently serving a prison sentence of a year or more. People in respect of whom a bankruptcy restrictions order has effect are disqualified from (existing) membership of the House of Commons (details differ slightly in different countries).

Members are not permitted to resign their seats. In practice, however, they always can. Should a member wish to resign from the Commons, they may request appointment to one of two ceremonial Crown offices: that of Crown Steward and Bailiff of the Chiltern Hundreds, or that of Crown Steward and Bailiff of the Manor of Northstead. These offices are sinecures (that is, they involve no actual duties); they exist solely to permit the "resignation" of members of the House of Commons. The Chancellor of the Exchequer is responsible for making the appointment, and, by convention, never refuses to do so when asked by a member who desires to leave the House of Commons.

== Title ==
Members of Parliament are entitled to use the post-nominal initials MP. MPs are referred to as "honourable" as a courtesy only during debates in the House of Commons (e.g., "the honourable member for ..."), or if they are the children of peers below the rank of marquess ("the honourable [first name] [surname]"). Those who are members of the Privy Council use the form The Right Honourable (The Rt Hon.) Name MP.

== Responsibilities ==
The first duty of a member of Parliament is to do what they think in their faithful and disinterested judgement is right and necessary for the honour and safety of Great Britain. The second duty is to their constituents, of whom they are the representative but not the delegate. Burke's famous declaration on this subject is well known. It is only in the third place that their duty to party organisation or programme takes rank. All these three loyalties should be observed, but there is no doubt of the order in which they stand under any healthy manifestation of democracy.

— Winston Churchill, Duties of a Member of Parliament (c. 1954–1955)

Theoretically, contemporary MPs are considered to have two duties, or three if they belong to a political party. Their primary responsibility is to act in the national interest. They must also act in the interests of their constituents, where this does not override their primary responsibility. Finally, if they belong to a political party, they may act in the interests of that party, subordinate to the other two responsibilities. In practice, however, the third responsibility takes precedence during voting due to a strong whipping system.

== See also ==
- Constituencies of the Parliament of the United Kingdom
- List of MPs elected in the 2024 United Kingdom general election
- List of MPs elected in the 2019 United Kingdom general election
- Member of the Scottish Parliament
- Member of the Senedd
- Member of the Legislative Assembly (Northern Ireland)
- List of parliaments of the United Kingdom
