= Mandate (politics) =

Authority granted by a constituency to act as its representative

In representative democracies, a mandate is a perceived legitimacy to rule through popular support. Mandates can be conveyed through elections, in which voters choose political parties and candidates based on their own policy preferences. The election results are then interpreted to determine which policies are popularly supported. The modern concept of a political mandate first developed around the 16th century and became a prominent aspect of politics after the French Revolution.

== Development and function ==
A mandate is a social construct based on what is understood to be the will of the voters. Mandate theory proposes that political parties are vehicles for policy options. Voters choose from these options during elections, which then empowers the policies that have the most popular support and allows for their implementation. When voters overwhelmingly support a specific party or candidate in an election, it may be interpreted as a communication from the voters that they wish for the associated political platform to be implemented, creating a mandate for that platform. Mandates are based on the idea that all voters are equal, and popular assent from the group as a whole is necessary to govern. Those involved in politics look to mandates to determine what is expected by the voters and what they will consider acceptable. A mandate is desirable for political parties, as it gives them leeway in policy implementation. A party or candidate may claim to have a mandate, but it only confers a political advantage if this claim is widely accepted. Non-electoral governments, such as dictatorships and monarchies, may also claim to have a popular mandate to rule.

Mandates develop from the interpretation of elections. If it becomes widely accepted that the voters support a given platform, then it will be understood that a mandate exists. There is no agreed upon metric for how much support a position must have—or be believed to have—before there is a mandate for its implementation. The median mandate is the theory that the policy preferences of the median voter give a political mandate. This presents its own challenges when applied, as median policy preferences are often more complex and have multiple dimensions.

Modern democracies do not consistently provide a majority mandate, as several competing parties offer different policies, requiring coalition governments to make compromises between their members. In the event of a coalition government, there is no single party with a popular mandate, as every party was supported by less than half of voters. In any coalition-based system, voters are unable to know what coalitions may form after an election, further distancing voter preferences from electoral results. In the United States, the two-party system always results in one party having a majority in government that can be interpreted as a mandate. Some political systems, such as that of the United Kingdom, frequently give a majority of legislative seats to a party that received only a plurality of the vote. In this case, the majority only carries a mandate if it is representative of the median voter.

The existence of political mandate as a concept is challenged by supporters of deliberative democracy, who believe that parties are elected as representatives to negotiate and compromise between different policy proposals. Direct democracy bypasses the issue of mandates entirely as it allows voters to choose policies directly.

== History ==
Popular vote margins of victory in US presidential elections since 1828

Mandates can also be attributed to wider margins of victory in the electoral collage.

Ancient Greece and the Roman Republic both incorporated ideas of citizenship in their governments that granted all men the right to participate in political decisions. In the post-classical era, the authority of a ruler was typically accepted without question and without consideration of the wishes of the people. Religious authority or the blessing of a deity was often invoked as justification for a ruler's power. The first ideas of a mandate for popular rule developed around the year 1500. These ideas began to see political implementation during the Age of Revolution, when monarchical rule was overthrown across many kingdoms through popular uprising. The French Revolution specifically invoked popular mandate as a necessary factor for political legitimacy. As modern electoral politics emerged, rulers came to seek legitimacy from popular mandate in individual constituencies.

A recent example of asserting a mandate is US President Donald Trump promoting his 2024 victory as a mandate, though he received 49.8% of the popular vote. His 1.5 percentage point margin of victory in 2024 place it in the 20th percentile of presidential elections since 1828. Warren Harding's 1920 popular vote margin was +26.2 percentage points.

== See also ==
- Consent of the governed
- Divine right of kings
- Election promise
- Mandate of Heaven
- Referendum
- Social contract
- Imperative mandate
