= Political representation =

How politicians represent citizens

In political science, political representation is a process in which one party acts in the making of public policy on behalf of another party.

Views vary widely on what representing implies and on the duties of representatives. For example, representing may imply acting on the expressed wishes of citizens, or it may alternatively imply acting according to what the representatives themselves judge is in the best interests of citizens. Under the proportional representation system and some other theories, an elected representative is held to be accountable only to the voting block that elected them, and that every substantial voting block deserves to have representation. While under winner-take-all systems such as first-past-the-post voting, the member is said to represent all the residents in the district where he was elected.

Representatives may be viewed as individuals who have been authorized to act on the behalf of others or may alternatively be viewed as being held to account by those they are representing. Political representation can happen along different units such as social groups and area, and there are different types of representation such as substantive representation and descriptive representation.

== Views of political representation ==
Under the accountability view, a representative is an individual who will be held to account. Representatives are held accountable if citizens can judge whether the representative is acting in their best interest and sanction the representative accordingly.

The descriptive and symbolic views of political representation describe the ways in which political representatives "stand for" the people they represent. Descriptive representatives "stand for" to the extent that they resemble, in their descriptive characteristics (e.g. race, gender, class etc.), the people they represent. On the other hand, symbolic representatives "stand for" the people they represent as long as those people believe in or accept them as their representative.

Hanna Fenichel Pitkin argues that these views of political representation give an inadequate account of political representation because they do not mention how representatives "act for" the represented and the normative criteria that citizens use for judging representative's actions. Hence, Pitkin proposes a substantive view of representation. In this view of political representation, representation is defined as substantive "acting for", by representatives, the interests of the people they represent.

In contrast, Jane Mansbridge has identified four views of democratic political representation: promissory, anticipatory, surrogate and gyroscopic. Mansbridge argues that each of these views provides an account of both how democratic political representatives "act for" the people they represent and the normative criteria for assessing the actions of representatives. Promissory representation is a form of representation in which representatives are chosen and assessed based on the promises they make to the people they represent during election campaigns. For Mansbridge, promissory representation, preoccupied with how representatives are chosen (authorized) and held to account through elections, is the traditional view of democratic political representation. Anticipatory, surrogate and gyroscopic representation, on the other hand, are recent views that have emerged from the work of empirical political scientists. Anticipatory representatives take actions that they believe voters (the represented) will reward in the next election. Surrogate representation occurs when representatives "act for" the interest of people outside their constituencies. Finally, in gyroscopic representation, representatives use their own judgements to determine how and what they should act for on behalf of the people they represent.

Under Andrew Rehfeld's general theory of representation, a person is considered a representative as long as the particular group they represent judges them as such. In any case of political representation, there are representatives, the represented, a selection agent, a relevant audience and rules by which the relevant judge whether a person is a representative. Representatives are those who are selected by a selection agent from a larger set of qualified individuals who are then judged to representatives by a relevant audience using particular rules of judgement. The rules by which a relevant audience judges whether a person is a representative can be either democratic or non-democratic. In a case where the selection agent, relevant audience and the represented are the same and the rules of judgment are democratic (e.g. elections), the familiar democratic case of political representation arises and where they are not, undemocratic cases arise.

== Units of representation ==
=== Representation by population ===
This is the preferred (and very common) method for democratic countries, where elected representatives are chosen by similarly-sized groups of voters defined by single-member geographic districts. This is expressed commonly by the term "one person, one vote" in the US, and is commonly used to apply to equality between the many single-member districts that divide the country. The votes-to-seat ratio is commonly based on local census records of population. However even where districts are very equal in size of population, under the first-past-the-post electoral system, elected members receive wide variation of votes cast, due to varying number of voters within the population, varying voter turn-out rate, and varying percentage of votes cast that are necessary to win a plurality, from district to district.

The associated shortened term "rep-by-pop" is used in Canada, where it means that each province is given the number of seats in the House of Commons that is equal to its portion of Canada's population. Where the election system used is not proportional as to parties, such as first-past-the-post voting, the House of Commons may still exhibit a degree of disproportionality as to party representation, even if each province has its fair share of seats.

=== Representation by area or political unit (not population) ===
This form of representation tends to occur as a political necessity for unifying many independent actors, such as in a federation (e.g. NATO, the UN). It is unusual (and controversial) where it exists within countries because of its violation of the 'one person, one vote' principle.

Such over-representation of voters in sparsely-settled areas may stem from a former existence as a self-identifying jurisdiction. Examples of representation by area within countries tend to be historical remnants of when the components of those countries were separate colonies or states before their unification. For example, the Constitution of the United States contains rep-by-area features due to smaller states already holding disproportionate power in the proceedings from the Articles of Confederation, in which each state, of whatever geographical size and irrespective of the size of its delegation, had one vote.

In Canada, each of the Territories is large in size geographically and each has one MP even though in each case its population size would not make them eligible for the MP. Prince Edward Island has more than expected representation in Parliament (in the Commons as well as the Senate) relative to the per capita representation rate in Ontario, British Columbia, and Alberta, due to the historical reason that PEI was a colony equivalent constitutionally to Upper Canada and Lower Canada prior to Confederation. PEI is geographically small so its relative over-representation is not due to area, as is the case in the Territories.

=== Representation of a unanimous constituency ===
Some systems allow voters to self-sort into groups of common sentiment and for each have its own representative.

Proportional representation election systems operate that way. With no claim that a population group or a geographical area, wherein the voters have diverse opinions, must be represented by just one member, the electorate can split into unanimous constituencies that each elect a member who naturally represents that group with no pretense of representing others.

== Models of representation ==
Models of representation refer to ways in which elected officials behave in representative democracies. There are three main types: delegate, trustee, and politico.

=== Delegate model ===
A delegate is someone who is elected to represent and convey the views of others. The delegate model of representation suggests that representatives have little or no capacity to exercise their own judgement or preferences. They are merely elected to be the mouthpiece of their constituency and act only the way their constituents would want them to, regardless of their own opinion. A member elected by just a portion of the voters in the district may convey the view of their supporters but is likely unable to represent the views of all in the district.

Joseph Tussman stated, "The essence of representation is the delegation or granting of authority. To authorize a representative is to grant another the right to act for oneself. Within the limits of the grant of authority one is, in fact, committing himself in advance to the decision or will of another".

Under representative government a person is elected, not just a tally mark for a particular party. Between elections, voters have little control of the behavior of the member, who might even cross the floor to a different party. This freedom may be useful though as the member works as a trustee.

=== Trustee model ===
A trustee is someone who acts on behalf of others, using his or her knowledge, experience and intelligence upon a certain field. The trustee model contrasts with the delegate model as this time constituents "entrust" their elected representatives to represent them however they see fit, with autonomy to vote and behave in the best way for their constituents.

Edmund Burke, who formulated the model, stated in a speech, "You choose a member indeed; but when you have chosen him he is not member of Bristol, but he is a member of parliament...your representative owes you, not his industry only, but his judgement; and he betrays, instead of serving you, if he sacrifices it to your own opinion".

=== Politico model ===
The politico model came about when theorists recognized that representatives rarely consistently act as just a delegate or just a trustee when representing their constituents. It is a hybrid of the two models discussed above and involves representatives acting as delegates and trustees, depending on the issue.

=== Other models ===
The mandate model views representatives as less independent actors. This came about after the emergence of modern political parties; now constituents rarely vote for a representative based on their personal qualities but more broadly, they vote for their party to be elected into government. A mandate is an order or instruction from a superior body therefore this model suggests representatives follow the party line and must carry out policies outlined during election campaigns.

The resemblance model is less concerned about the way representatives are selected and more concerned whether they resemble the group they claim to represent. It is similar to descriptive representation, they argue that to represent a group of people such as the working class or women to its full potential you must be part of that social group yourself. Therefore, only people who have shared experiences and interests can fully identify with particular issues.

== Types of representation ==
Alternative ways of considering representation are as follows:

=== Substantive representation ===
Substantive representation occurs when representatives' opinions and actions reflect the wishes, needs, and interests of the people they represent. Democratic theorists often study substantive representation in terms of ideological congruence, meaning that representation is high when representatives hold the same policy positions as their constituents. The congruence can be estimated as the distance between the government and the median voter for individual countries. Recent research shows that the ideological opinion-policy relationship is upheld for both foreign and domestic affairs, although foreign affairs and defense policy were long considered immune to public pressure. According to Hanna F. Pitkin's The Concept of Representation (1967), the standard for assessing the quality of substantive representation is the representative's responsiveness to the evolving needs of their citizenry. As a result, low substantive representation in representative democracies usually arises from representatives' inability to judge and act on the interests of the public rather than inactivity in office. Pitkin also argues that substantive representation should be apparent through the nature of government action between elections. Thus, substantive representation is predicated on the fact that democracy is evident between elections rather than isolated to formal procedures like voting.

Recently, Pitkin's concept of substantive representation has been criticized by several political scientists on the grounds that it "assumes a static notion that interests are entities waiting to be brought into the representational process." Among these scholars is Michael Saward (2010), who argues that substantive representation should be constructed as a process of "claims-making" in which representatives "speak for" their constituents. However, Eline Severs (2012) disparages this logic, as she claims it obscures the interactions between representatives and the represented that are essential to the substantive representation process.

Substantive representation is not a universally accepted concept; minimalist theorists like Adam Przeworski (1999) reject the idea that representatives can be driven to act in the best interests of the public. In contrast to substantive representation, minimalists believe that democracy is merely a system in which competitive elections select rulers and that democracies should be defended regardless of the outcomes they produce for their citizenry. Nonetheless, democratic theorists often consider substantive representation to be salient due to its emphasis on action in office, particularly in relation to the interests of women and ethnic minorities.

=== Descriptive representation ===
Scholars have defined representation as "the making present in some sense of something which is nevertheless not present literally or in fact". Descriptive representation is the idea that a group elects an individual to represent them who in their own characteristics mirror some of the more frequent experiences and outward manifestations of the group. This descriptive representation can have again different types such as "perfect over representation", "over representation", "proper representation", "under/nominal representation" & "No representation".

In this form of representation, representatives are in their own persons and lives in some sense typical of the larger class of persons whom they represent. For example, an ethnic group or gender-based group may want to elect a leader that shares these descriptive characteristics as they may be politically relevant.

Disadvantaged groups may gain benefit from descriptive representation primarily in two ways:

1. When there is mistrust: This refers to a situation where communication between the group and its representatives has been inadequate. In these cases, descriptive representation promotes vertical communication between representatives and their group of constituents.
2. When interests are uncrystallized: In certain historical moments, citizen interests are not clearly defined. Either the issues have not been on the political agenda for long, or candidates have not taken public positions on them. In this case, the best way to have one's substantive interests represented is often to choose a descriptive representative whose characteristics match one's own. As the situation evolves, the voters may trust in the elected representative's actions because that representative shares their core beliefs.

Descriptive representation is instituted by political parties independently if they set aside party seats for members of particular groups by such mechanisms as placement on the party list. It can also be instituted through national electoral quotas that reserve seats for elected members of particular types or candidate quotas that demand political parties nominate candidates of particular types or place them on party lists.

Traditionally, quotas have been thought of as a way of providing adequate representation for women, oppressed ethnic groups and other previously disadvantaged groups. However, another way of conceptualizing quotas is to institute a maximum or ceiling quota for advantaged groups. This repositioning may improve the meritocracy of the system and improve the process of candidate selection.

Empirically, quotas show mixed results. In Lesotho, quota-mandated female representation has had no effect or even reduced several dimensions of women's engagement with local politics. In Argentina, quotas have produced negative stereotypes about women politicians.

Meanwhile, in India, women more often win an election in a constituency that formerly had quotas, even when the quotas are removed, and women leaders provide public goods favoured by women constituents. Evidence also shows that while caste-based quotas may not change stereotypes of how people view the oppressed caste group, they do change the social norms of interaction between caste groups (Note: For data on gender quota adoption from 1947 to 2015, see the Quota Adoption and Reform Over Time (QAROT) data set.)

=== Dyadic representation ===
Dyadic representation refers to the degree to which and ways by which elected legislators represent the preferences or interests of the specific geographic constituencies from which they are elected. Candidates who run for legislative office in an individual constituency or as a member of a list of party candidates are especially motivated to provide dyadic representation.

As Carey and Shugart (1995, 417) observe, they have "incentives to cultivate a personal vote" beyond whatever support their party label will produce. Dyadic representation is easier when a district is fairly homogenous than it is in a district where the electorate is divided into many various belief-groups and where the largest voting block does not compose a majority of the voters.

Personal vote seeking might arise from representing the public policy interests of the constituency (by way of either the delegate, responsible party, or trustee models noted above), providing it "pork barrel" goods, offering service to individual constituents as by helping them acquire government services, and symbolic actions. Meantime, distributive log-rolling was (and is) cause of complaint in ward politics. That is why some prefer at-large elections.

The most abundant scientific scholarship on dyadic representation has been for the US Congress and for policy representation of constituencies by the members of the Congress. Miller and Stokes (1963) presented the seminal research of this kind in an exploratory effort to account for when alternative models of policy representation arise. Their work has been emulated, replicated, and enlarged by a host of subsequent studies. The most advanced theoretical formulation in this body of work, however, is by Hurley and Hill (2003) and by Hill, Jordan, and Hurley (2015) who present a theory that accounts well for when belief sharing representation, delegate representation, trustee representation, responsible party representation, and party elite led representation will arise.

=== Collective representation ===
The concept of collective representation can be found in various normative theory and scientific works, but Weissberg (1978, 535) offered the first systematic characterization of it in the scientific literature and for the US Congress, defining such representation as "Whether Congress as an institution represents the American people, not whether each member of Congress represented his or her particular district." Hurley (1982) elaborated and qualified Weissberg's explication of how such representation should be assessed and how it relates to dyadic representation. Stimson, MacKuen, and Erikson (1995), offer the most advanced theoretical exposition of such representation for the US Congress. And the latter work was extended in Erikson, MacKuen, and Stimson (2002).

In most parliamentary political systems with strong (or ideologically unified) political parties and where the election system is dominated by parties instead of individual candidates, the primary basis for representation is also a collective, party based one. The foundational work on assessing such representation is that of Huber and Powell (1994) and Powell (2000).

== See also ==
- Apportionment and redistricting
- Delegate vs trustee model of representation
- Gerrymandering
- Interactive representation
- Political representation of nature
- Proportional Representation
- Representative democracy
- Sortition
- Taxation without representation
