= PlaceAVote.com =

- Founded: 2014
- Headquarters: Los Angeles, CA, U.S.
- Key people: Luke Arrigoni; Ben Colman; Job Melton
- Website: www.PlaceAVote.com

PlaceAVote.com was a grassroots American organization that provides a peer-to-peer framework to review, discuss, and vote on every issue before United States Congress. The guiding principle in PlaceAVote's development is to provide a boundary-free, non-partisan forum in which the collective will of the people can be gathered and communicated to their United States Congressional Representatives in order for representation to actually take place. Since the 2014 primaries, over 50 candidates across the United States expressed an interest in running on the PlaceAVote platform. Founded in 2014, PlaceAVote's mission is to facilitate democracy and to combat government corruption in the United States and abroad.

== 2014 Congressional elections ==
Two congressional candidates ran on the Placeavote.com platform of leveraging tech to fully represent constituents in the 2014 elections: Job Melton Democrat (CA-16) and John Catano Republican (CA-22). These candidates leveraged PlaceAVote to engage, educate and interact with constituents in order to represent their will by voting according to voter consensus. The candidacies triggered an interest in this idea across the US. As an example of the underlying non-partisan nature of the proposal and the importance for the national conversation to be about the issues rather than the party, both candidates changed their lifetime party affiliation to match that of their districts constituency.

== 2016 Congressional elections ==
As of May 2014 over 50 congressional candidates expressed an interest in running in 2016 on Placeavote.com platform in cities including but not limited to Seattle, San Francisco, Los Angeles, New York, Austin, Philadelphia, Chicago, Sacramento, Fresno, St. Louis, Orlando and Atlanta.

== Security and encryption ==
PlaceAVote.com provides secure voting via public-key cryptography. For every vote cast, the resulting "Yes" or "No" value is encrypted via a public-key. When the vote is final, all public keys along with their corresponding signature-values and vote-values are published for a public audit. This approach prevents tampering with the system while allowing voters to remain anonymous.

== Public opinion ==
PlaceAVote.com advocates criticize the current political system's tendency to only represent the organized voice of special interests, arguing that the current system is an example of the minority ruling the majority via well-funded special interests. The current delegation system assumes that representatives are experts or are given access to experts on pending legislation. However the truth is that most of the representatives in congress are actually not experts in all the issues but come from a law background. PlaceAVote instead creates a system where experts of differing opinions can come together and publicly debate the merits and weaknesses of upcoming legislation. Though mechanisms within the software that allow for the development of peer to peer coalitions around issues, legislation will be created based on need and public benefit rather than political payback.

== History ==
PlaceAVote was founded in Los Angeles, California by Ben Colman and Luke Arrigoni. Colman had previously worked at Google, and founded RivalMe, an algorithmic social app developer. Arrigoni previously worked at Creative Artists Agency and founded Ventata.com, a dynamic pricing company.
