= Imperative mandate =

Political system binding representatives to voters' orders

The imperative mandate is a political system in which representatives are required to enact policies in accordance with orders or instructions received from the voters. Failure to follow these instructions may result in the representative being dismissed or recalled.

== History ==
The imperative mandate goes back to the Middle Ages. It was disregarded by the French National Assembly of 1789, but then it was briefly embraced by the revolutionary assemblies in Paris in 1793. It was embraced in the Paris Commune and by the Council Communism movement, as well as by Vladimir Lenin in "The State and Revolution" and by the Zapatistas in Mexico.

== Prohibition ==
Most representative democracies follow a system of a free mandate, where once elected a representative may enact any policy free from any orders. Many of these countries specifically prohibit the imperative mandate as incompatible with democracy.

It was also rejected in the American Revolution, following the modern representative system.

=== France ===
The elimination of an imperative mandate was one of the constitutional effects of the French Revolution of 1789.

The French Constitution of 1791 specifically prohibited the practice:

"The representatives elected in the departments will not be representatives of a particular department, but of the whole nation, and no mandate can be conferred on them"

— French Constitution of 1791, art. 7, section III, chapter I, title III.

This view represented a shift in the attributing sovereignty to the people as a whole through their representatives where it was previously attributed solely in the monarch. As described by Ernesto Galli della Loggia: "Every single person elected by the people, every parliamentarian, is the representative of the nation-people as a whole, and therefore the depositary of its entire sovereign will (...) They must necessarily represent, equally symbolically, the whole people, the electoral body in its entirety. In continental European representative democracies there is a ban on the [imperative] mandate ".

== See also ==
- Models of representation
- Delegate model of representation
- Imperative mandate (provision in the Constitution of Ukraine)
- Soviet democracy
