= People's Power League =

American political organization

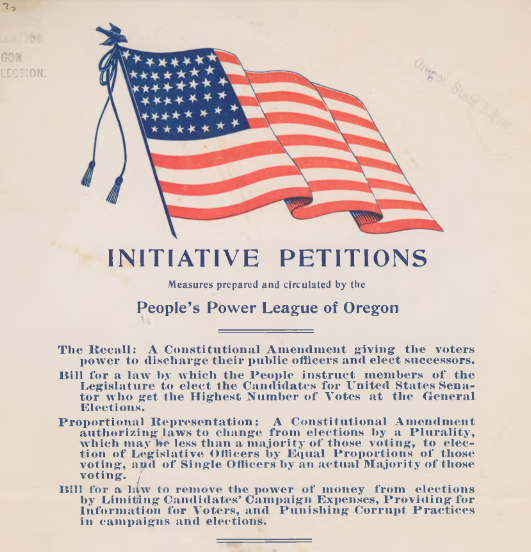
Initiative petitions from the Oregon chapter of the People's Power League

The People's Power League was an important Progressive organization, formed in 1892 by James William Sullivan and led by William U'Ren, that was devoted to governmental reforms in the United States in the early 20th century. Ellis Oberholtzer noted that the tradition behind the League reached back to the egalitarian Pennsylvania Constitution. Both the Pennsylvania radical and the League supported unicameral legislatures (a second house being viewed as a protection for aristocratic influences); a mechanism of rapidly replacing elected officials (in the case of the League, through recall elections; in the case of the Pennsylvanians, through annual elections and rotation in office); and a body of elected officials to launch a full-scale investigation into the government at fixed intervals (in the League's case, the People's Inspectors of Government; in Pennsylvania's case, the Council of Censors). Other radical leaders associated with the League were Will Daly, George Orton, Alfred Cridge, and E.S.J. McAllister. Its predecessor organization was the Direct Legislation League.

In addition to supporting the Initiative, the Referendum, the short ballot (which made more state offices subject to appointment rather than election), Recall of elected officials, and a unicameral legislature, the League also supported proportional representation via SNTV according to which every legislative district would be represented by at least two members—those receiving the most votes there—but no resident would be allowed to vote for more than one candidate. According to the PPL's "Proxy" version of SNTV, electors could vote for representatives in other districts than their own (but were still restricted to one vote overall), and those party-sponsored gubernatorial candidates who had been unsuccessful in the last election would be ex officio members of the legislature, required to represent all voters whose candidates had lost in this SNTV election. Progressive author/editor Herbert Croly of The New Republic described the People's Power League platform at length in his 1912 book Progressive Democracy. The New York Times also reported on this proposal in 1912. The League's influence dropped precipitously in Oregon subsequent to a series of failed attempts to put their plans into action via amendments to the Oregon Constitution between 1909 and 1914.
