= Million People March =

2013 protest in the Philippines against Pork Barrel funds

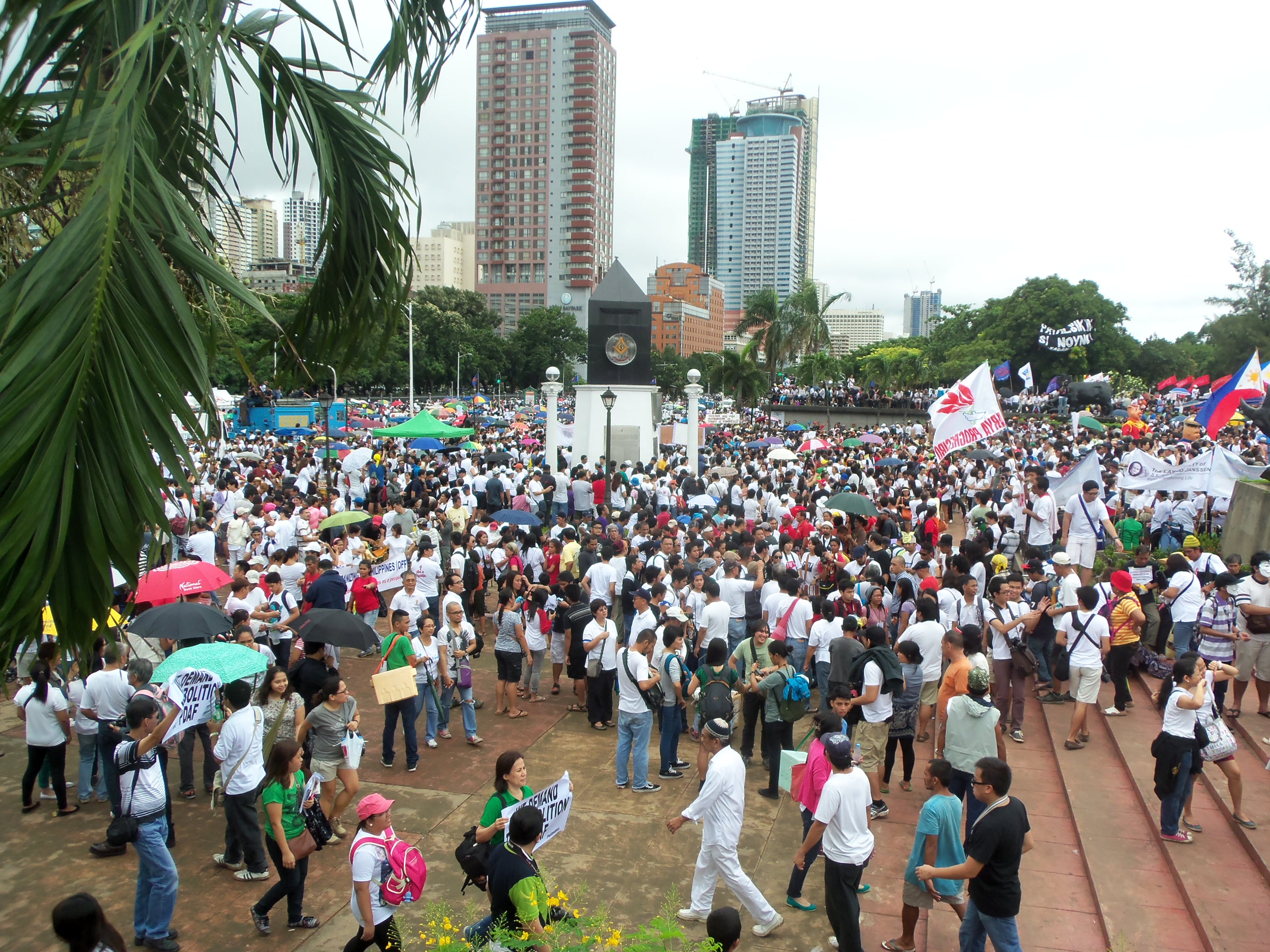
- Demonstrators in Luneta Park
- Date: August 22–26, 2013
- Location: Key Philippine cities, mainly in Luneta Park in Manila. Some locations overseas.
- Caused by: • Misuse of the Priority Development Assistance Fund in light of the Priority Development Assistance Fund scam • Political corruption
- Goals: • Abolition of all Pork Barrel Funds • Political transparency and accountability
- Methods: Demonstrations, protest marches, online activism, sit-ins, petitioning
- Status: Ended

Number
Philippines: 75,000-400,000+ Cities: 75,000-400,000 in Manila; 4,000 in Cebu City; 3,000 in Davao City; 3,000 in Zamboanga City; 1,000 in Angeles City; ~1,000 in Iloilo City; ~1,000 in Vigan; 800 in Puerto Princesa; 700 in Baguio; 700 in Iligan City; 500 in Olongapo; 300 in Legazpi; 300 in Surigao City; 100 in New York City; 60 in Dagupan; 20 in Santiago, Isabela	

The Million People March at Luneta was the first of a series of protests in the Philippines calling for the total abolition of the Pork Barrel fund, which were triggered by public anger over the Priority Development Assistance Fund scam. Initial calls circulated through social media (mainly on Facebook and Twitter (now X)) to convene a protest on August 26, 2013, at Luneta Park in Manila as well as other cities nationwide and overseas. Some media commentators consider this as the first ever massive rally in the Philippines called and organised mostly through social media channels.

== Background ==
The so-called "Pork Barrel Scam" was first exposed in the Philippine Daily Inquirer on July 12, 2013, with the six-part exposé of the Inquirer on the scam pointing to businesswoman Janet Lim-Napoles as the scam's mastermind after Benhur K. Luy, her second cousin and former personal assistant, was rescued by agents of the National Bureau of Investigation on March 22, 2013, four months after he was detained by Napoles at her unit at the Pacific Plaza Towers in Fort Bonifacio. Initially centering on Napoles' involvement in the 2004 Fertilizer Fund scam. After Napoles turned to Malacanang for help regarding the supposed harassment by members of the NBI in April 2013, the whistleblowers and their lawyer presented affidavits stating that Napoles' company "had defrauded the government of billions of pesos in ghost projects involving the creation of at least 20 bogus nongovernment organizations."

The government investigation on Luy's testimony has since expanded to cover Napoles' involvement in a wider scam involving the misuse of PDAF funds from 2003 to 2013. 8 of the 82 questionable NGOs are linked to Napoles with the filing of complaints for 74 others currently pending. "As more and more records—even from recent years—are examined, it appears that the misuse of pork did not stop in 2009. And while the congressional pork barrel already puts at least 25 billion a year in the hands of lawmakers, the fact is there are hundreds of billions worth of special and regular funds disbursed and possibly misused year after year".

It is estimated that the Government of the Philippines was defrauded of some ₱10 billion from 2007 to 2009 (with the investigation requested to continue to cover the first few years under the Aquino administration) with a sizeable amount reportedly having been diverted to Napoles, participating members of Congress and other Government officials. Aside from the PDAF and the fertilizer fund maintained by the Department of Agriculture, around ₱900 million in royalties earned from the Malampaya gas field were also lost to the scam. The scam has provoked public outrage, with calls being made on the Internet for popular protests to demand the abolition of the Pork Barrel Fund, and the order for Napoles' arrest sparking serious discussion online.

== Event ==
A Facebook event entitled "MILLION PEOPLE MARCH TO LUNETA AUGUST 26: SA ARAW NG MGA BAYANI. PROTESTA ng BAYAN!!!" was created by Arnold Pedrigal and Bernardo Bernardo using the Power ng Pinoy Facebook page to invite participants to the protests. It stemmed from Ito Rapadas' original Facebook status post of protesting the pork barrel fund mess with a Million People March. The Facebook status says "what we need is a MILLION PEOPLE MARCH by struggling Filipino taxpayers- a day of protest by the silent majority that would demand all politicians and govt. officials (whatever the political stripes, color they may carry) to stop pocketing our taxes borne out from our hard work by means of these pork barrel scams and other creative criminal acts".

Peachy Rallonza-Bretaña, a long-time advertising executive, reposted it as a call to action with a date and a place to it- Luneta, August 26. As one of the coordinators, Ms. Rallonza-Bretaña said that there is no main group leading the protest and described it as "snowballing at great speed". On the eve of the protests, 18,000 people from various groups had already arrived in Luneta Park. Unaffiliated people were asked to dress in white, but people were encouraged to go in the colours they wanted to, to reflect the protest's inclusive, non-partisan and decentralised nature.

On the day of the protest itself, the hashtags used by the coordinating group #MillionPeopleMarch and #ScrapPork reportedly trended first in the Philippines to show widespread support for the cause and that a large number of people monitoring the event.

=== Demands ===
The protesters on Aug 26 demanded the following:

- To scrap the pork barrel system
- To account for all misused funds
- To investigate and punish all those who misused funds

An attempt by the executive department to dialogue with the protesters were made but was shunned as a stunt by the coordinators of the event. Major protests were staged on September 11, 13, 21 in Metro Manila, Cebu, Bohol, Iloilo, Albay and many other provinces and cities in the Philippines as well as in Los Angeles, California and are expected to continue in the foreseeable future until all these demands are reportedly met.

=== Location ===
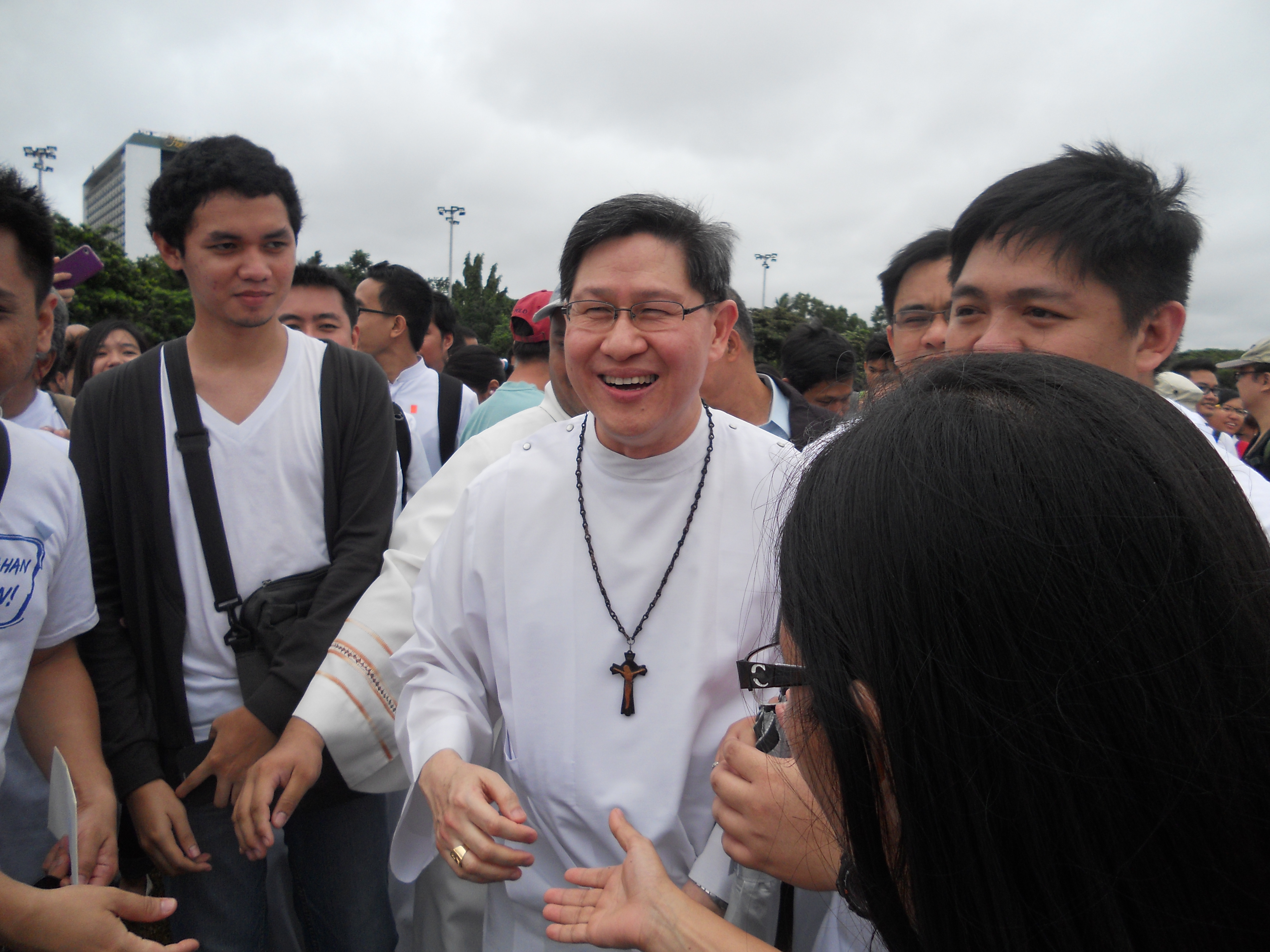
Cardinal Luís Antonio Tagle, Archbishop of Manila, made a surprise appearance at the protests, and his speech condemning those who ignorant of the poor helped stoke protesters' anger at corrupt officials.

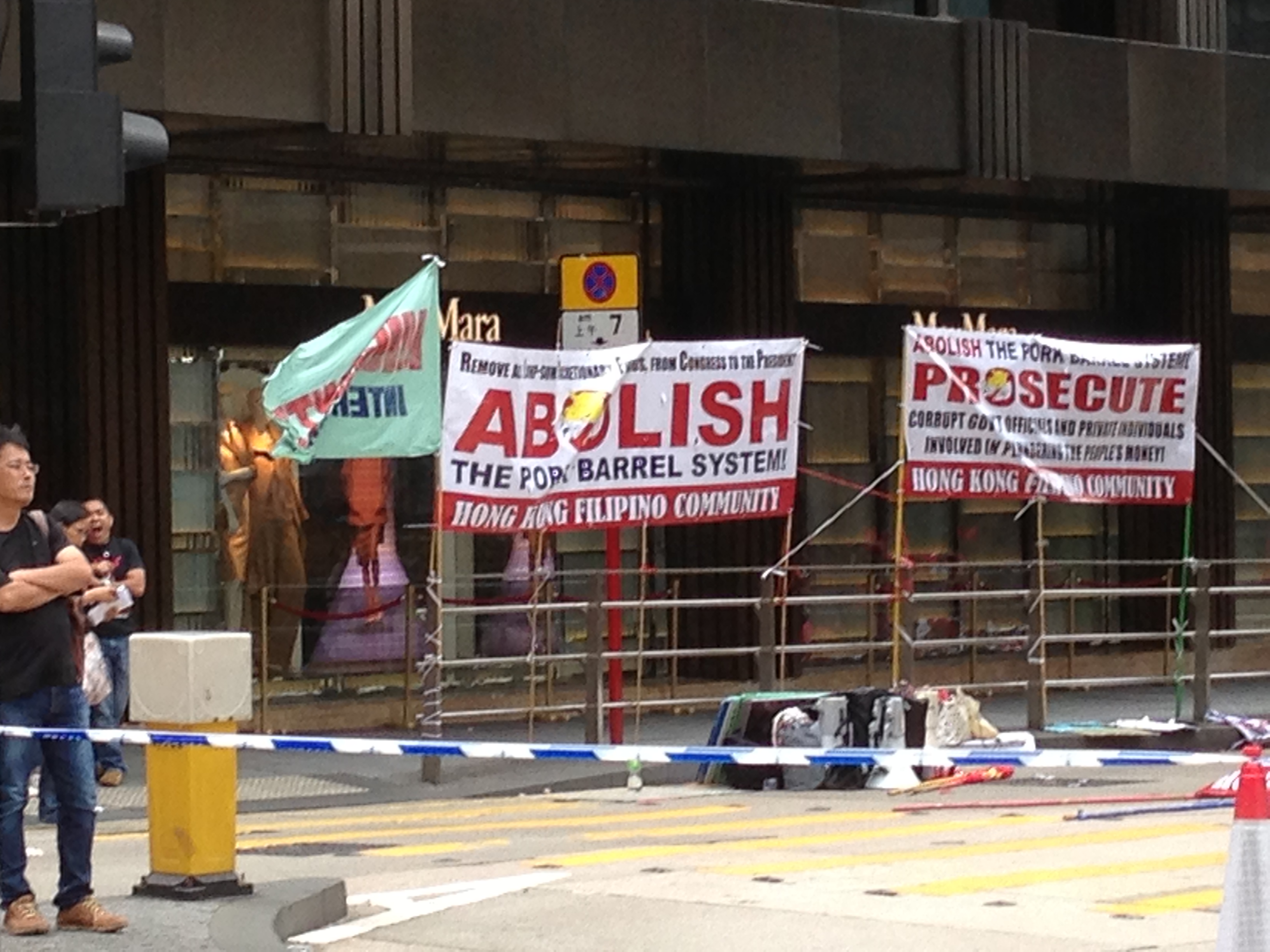
OFWs in Hong Kong's Central district sit near protest signs in Hong Kong.

The protests was mainly held at the Burnham Grounds of the Luneta Park in the City of Manila, the Philippine capital. Similar rallies were also held in other cities nationwide, including Bacolod, Baguio, Cebu City, Cagayan de Oro, Davao City, Dagupan, Digos, Dumaguete, Iligan City, Iloilo City, Kidapawan City, Legazpi, Naga City, Puerto Princesa, Tacloban, Tagbilaran City, Zamboanga City and in the province of Negros Occidental.

Overseas Filipinos worldwide conducted nominal protests, mostly indoors in their respective cities in the days leading to and on the same day as the Manila rally. Gatherings were held in Dammam and Riyadh in Saudi Arabia; Geneva; Bangkok; London; San Francisco, Los Angeles and New York in the United States; Hong Kong SAR; Canada; Taiwan; Vietnam; and the United Arab Emirates.

== Hacking of government websites ==
The Filipino hacktivist group PrivateX defaced at least thirty government websites early on August 26, hours before the main protests. These include the websites of the Philippine National Police and the Philippine Embassy in Rome, Italy.

== Evolution ==
Almost a year after the anniversary of the gathering, different anti-pork groups around the country coordinated to launch a People's Initiative Against Pork Barrel with the ultimate aim of banning pork barrel funds from the national budget. The move was brought about by the refusal of the executive and legislative branches to remove pork in the national budget even after a Supreme Court decision favoring the anti-pork movement.

The original event page is still actively used, though a Facebook page (Million People March to Stop Pork Barrel) has now been put up to provide updates on the issue and other corruption issues existing in government.

== See also ==
- List of protests in the 21st century
  - Trillion Peso March
