= Delegate model of representation =

Model of representative democracy; emphasizes constituent power over elected officials

The delegate model of representation is a model of a representative democracy. In this model, constituents elect their representatives as delegates for their constituency. These delegates act only as a mouthpiece for the wishes of their constituency/state and have no autonomy from the constituency, only the autonomy to vote for the actual representatives of the state. This model does not provide representatives the luxury of acting in their own conscience and is bound by imperative mandate. Essentially, the representative acts as the voice of those who are (literally) not present.

== History ==
Irish philosopher Edmund Burke (1729–1797) contested this model and supported the alternative trustee model of representation.

The delegate model of representation is made use of in various forms of council democracy and commune democracy. Models of democratic rule making extensive use of the delegate model of representation are often labeled "delegative democracy". However, the merging of these two terms is criticized as misleading.

== See also ==
- Trustee model of representation
- Liquid democracy
- Imperative mandate
