= William Simon U'Ren =

American lawyer and political activist

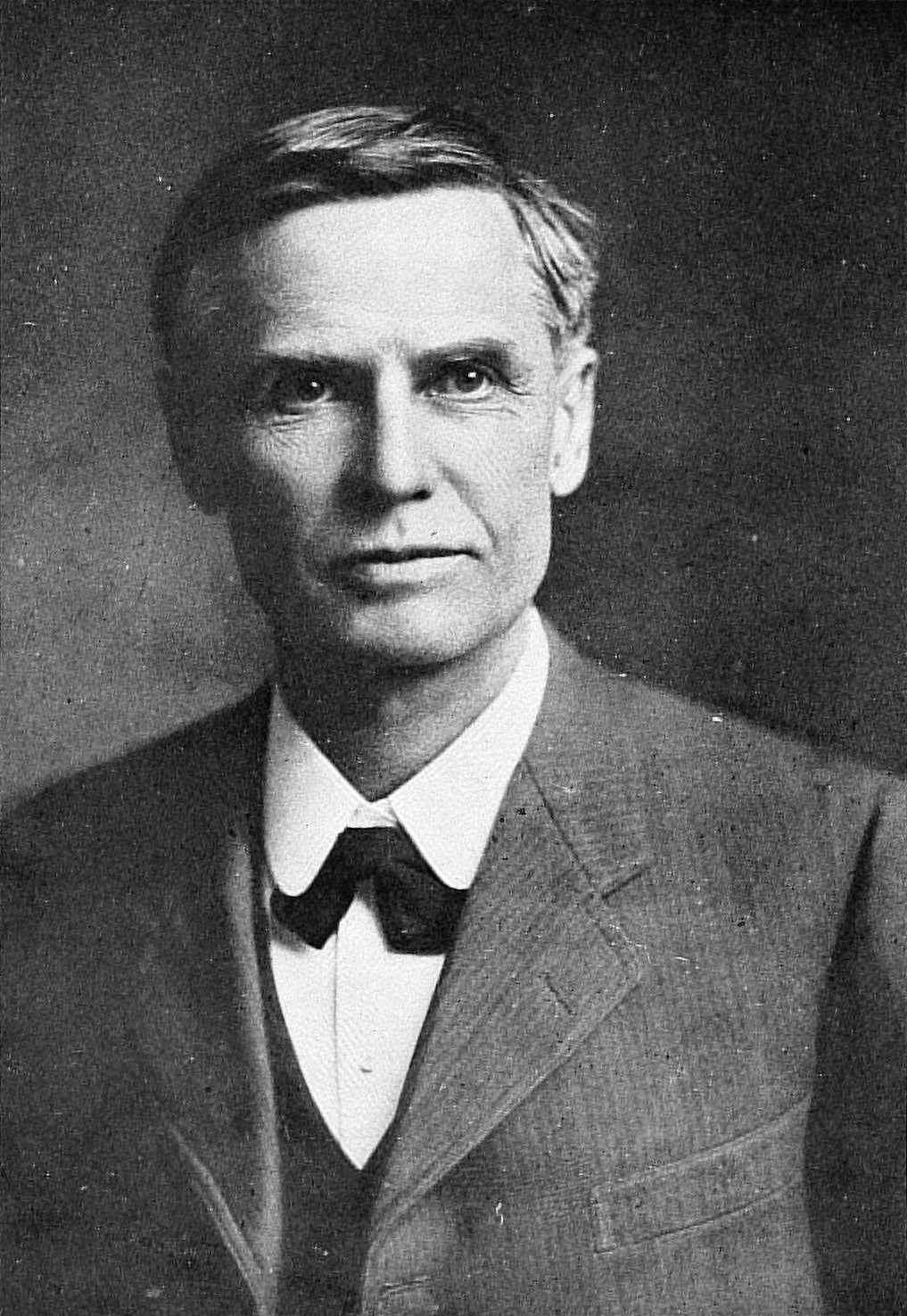

Member of the Oregon House of Representatives
- In office 1897–1898
- Constituency: Clackamas County

Personal details
- Born: January 10, 1859 Lancaster, Wisconsin, U.S.
- Died: March 8, 1949 (aged 90) Portland, Oregon, U.S.
- Party: Republican (until 1889); Populist (until 1898); Republican (after 1899)
- Other political affiliations: Progressive
- Occupation: Attorney, activist

William Simon U'Ren (January 10, 1859 – March 8, 1949) was an American lawyer and political activist. U'Ren promoted and helped pass a corrupt practices act, the presidential primary, and direct election of U.S. senators. As a progressive, U'Ren championed the initiative, referendum, and recall systems. These measures were also designed to promote democracy and weaken the power of backstage elites. His reforms in Oregon were widely copied in other states. He supported numerous other reforms, such as the interactive model of proportional representation, which was not enacted. He had little success in battles for a Georgist "Single Tax" on the unimproved value of land.

== Early life ==
William Simon U'Ren (accent the last syllable) was born on January 10, 1859, in Lancaster, Wisconsin, the son of immigrants from Cornwall, England. Their surname was originally spelled Uren. U'Ren's father, William Richard U'Ren was a socialist who worked as a blacksmith and emigrated to America owing to difficult economic conditions.

In America, the elder U'Ren lived as a farmer in the Midwest, working also as a blacksmith when possible. He also taught this trade to his son William. The family was both politically radical — following the journalism of Horace Greeley — but also devout albeit unconventional adherents of Christianity.

At the age of 17 the younger U'Ren left home to make his way in the world, working as a miner in the state of Colorado. U'Ren studied law and business in the evenings. He earned a law degree and was admitted to the Colorado state bar at the age of 21.

U'Ren practiced law for a time in the Colorado towns of Aspen, Gunnison, and Tincup. He also became involved in Republican Party politics and edited a newspaper for a time in Tincup.

A long-time sufferer of asthma, while in Colorado U'Ren contracted tuberculosis, and consequently moved to Hawaii in search of a climate that would make possible his recovery from the frequently fatal illness. It was in Honolulu that U'Ren was exposed to the economic work of Henry George, Progress and Poverty, which was greatly influential upon his thought.

In 1889, the 30-year-old U'Ren relocated to the Pacific Northwest, working for a time as a ranch hand for his parents in Eastern Oregon. U'Ren then moved to the western part of the state, settling in the town of Milwaukie, Oregon, just outside Portland, where he established a law practice. There U'Ren became involved both in reform politics and spiritualism — a major intellectual fad of the era — and became involved with the prominent Luelling family, who were actively interested in both pursuits.

In 1890, he campaigned vigorously for the Australian Ballot, which won in 1891. It was while he was involved in this campaign that he attended a séance, and met Mrs. Laure Durkee.

== Single Tax ==
In 1892 U'Ren suffered a severe asthma attack and gave up his law practice. Mrs. Durkee knew that the Lewellings, a local fruit growing family, had often offered lodging and care to hard luck cases, such as U'Ren was. His health was slowly restored at the Lewellings farm. Mr. and Mrs. Seth Lewelling were reformers (with one family member writing "good government being to us what religion is to most people"). U'ren was already a convert to progressive causes, especially the Single Tax proposed by Henry George. Albert Lewelling gave him a copy of James W. Sullivan's book Direct Legislation by the Citizenship Through the Initiative and Referendum (1892) and U'ren decided to invest his time and effort in the cause.

== Direct Legislation League ==
He was a leader of the People's Power League after 1892. U'Ren brought together representatives of the state Farmer's Alliance and labor unions to form the Direct Legislation League, of which he was named secretary. He had an express goal of implementing the three legs of direct democracy – Initiative, referendum, and recall. In 1894 U'Ren was elected chairman at the Populist Party convention, and won approval of an Initiative & Referendum platform plank. In 1896 U'Ren won a seat in the Oregon House of Representatives; however, in 1897 the House failed to organize, only holding a short special session in the fall of 1898. U'Ren worked the legislature during his term, without success, to gain approval for initiative and referendum. After his 1897 defeat, U'Ren reorganized the Oregon Direct Legislation League to broaden the base of initiative, referendum, and recall support. The new executive committee included bankers, the president of the state bar association, and The Oregonian editor Harvey W. Scott.

U'Ren and the Direct Legislation League won passage of an initiative and referendum amendment in 1898. Under the constitution of the time, amendments had to be approved by two successive sessions of the legislature. By 1902 the legislature had approved the amendment and voters had ratified it.

== Other initiatives ==
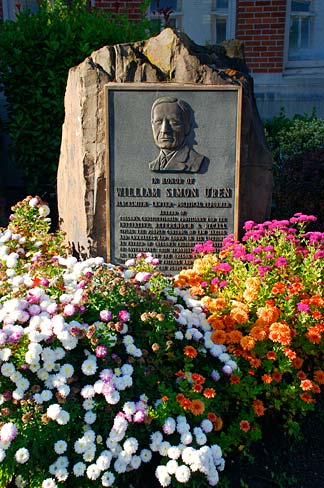
Plaque honoring U'Ren at the Clackamas County Courthouse in Oregon City

U'Ren associated himself with many initiative efforts, including banning free railroad passes, establishing popular election of U.S. Senators, and creating the first presidential primary in the United States. Two of the more significant early initiatives he sponsored were a 1906 constitutional amendment extending initiative and referendum powers to local jurisdictions, and a 1908 amendment that gave voters power to recall elected officials. In 1912, he proposed an amendment to the Oregon Constitution to essentially weigh each legislator's vote on proposed bills according to the number of votes he received in the last election; this measure failed by a large margin.

In 1908 U'Ren led the successful effort to amend the Oregon state constitution to accommodate proportional representation that would provide voters with first, second and third choices on the ballot. He said, "Real representative government is impossible unless all political parties, minorities as well as majorities, are thus fairly represented in the legislature in proportion to the number of supporters that each has among the voters."

U'Ren was a strong proponent of the single tax system advocated by Henry George, but was unsuccessful in getting it adopted in Oregon. After his defeat in a 1914 race for Governor on the single tax platform, he largely withdrew from active politics. Originally supportive of his campaign, U'Ren later denounced President Franklin Roosevelt and the New Deal, warning against dictatorship and a federal government out of control. U'Ren's proposition to tackle the Depression was to create a voluntary and bureaucratic-free "American Industrial Army". A Jeffersonian who believed in a third way between welfare statism and laissez-faire, U'Ren was critical of concentrated power anywhere until his death, supporting "constitutional reforms" to shackle monopolies. He was also critical of unions that acted dictatorial.

He died of pneumonia at age 90, in Portland, Oregon on March 8, 1949.
