= Trustee model of representation =

Model of representative democracy; emphasizes autonomy of elected officials

The trustee model of representation is a model of a representative democracy, frequently contrasted with the delegate model of representation. In this model, constituents elect their representatives as 'trustees' for their constituency. These 'trustees' have autonomy to deliberate and act as they see fit, in their own conscience even if it means going against the explicit desires of their constituents. By contrast, in the delegate model, the representative is expected to act strictly in accordance with the beliefs of their constituents.

== History ==
This model was formulated by Edmund Burke (1729–1797), an Irish MP and philosopher, who opposed the delegate model of representation. In the trustee model, Burke argued that his behavior in Parliament should be informed by his knowledge and experience, allowing him to serve the public interest. Essentially, a trustee considers an issue and, after hearing all sides of the debate, exercises their own judgment in making decisions about what should be done.

His unbiased opinion, his mature judgment, his enlightened conscience, he ought not to sacrifice to you, to any man, or to any set of men living. ... Your representative owes you, not his industry only, but his judgment; and he betrays, instead of serving you, if he sacrifices it to your opinion.

You choose a member, indeed; but when you have chosen him, he is not a member of Bristol, but he is a member of Parliament. (Burke, 1774)

He made these statements immediately after being elected, and after his colleague had spoken in favour of coercive instructions being given to representatives. Burke conscientiously objected to slavery, but needed to balance this against his electors' slave trade business. This played a minor role in decreasing support for reelecting him in Bristol, forcing him to run in Malton, which did not benefit from the slave trade.

John Stuart Mill preferred intelligent representatives. He stated that while all individuals have a right to be represented, not all political opinions are of equal value. He suggested a model where constituents would receive votes that increase based on each level of education past simple literacy and math.

== See also ==
- Delegate model of representation
