= Direct Legislation League =

United States political activism group

The Oregon Direct Legislation League was an organization of political activists founded by William S. U'Ren in the U.S. state of Oregon in 1898. U'Ren had been politically activated by reading the influential 1893 book Direct Legislation Through the Initiative and Referendum, and the group's founding followed in the wake of the 1896 founding of the National Direct Legislation League, which itself had its roots in the Direct Legislation League of New Jersey and its short-lived predecessor, the People's Power League.

The group led efforts in Oregon to establish an initiative and referendum system, allowing direct legislation by the state's citizens. In 1902, the Oregon Legislative Assembly approved such a system, which was known at the time as the Oregon System.

The group's further efforts led to successful ballot initiatives implementing a direct primary system in 1904, and allowing citizens to directly recall public officials in 1908.

== Direct Legislation League of California ==
California built the most successful grass roots progressive movement in the country by mobilizing independent organizations and largely ignoring the conservative state parties. The system continues strong into the 21st century. Following the Oregon model John Randolph Haynes organized the Direct Legislation League of California in 1902 to launch the campaign for inclusion of the initiative and referendum in the state's constitution. The League sent questionnaires to prospective candidates to the state legislature to obtain their stance on direct legislation and to make those positions public. It then flooded the state with letters seeking new members, money, and endorsements from organizations like the State Federation of Labor. As membership grew it worked with other private organizations to petition the state legislature, which was not responsive. In 1902 the League won a state constitutional amendment establishing direct democracy at the local level, and in 1904, it successfully engineered the recall of the first public official.

== See also ==
- List of Oregon ballot measures
